This is a list of foreign players (i.e. non-Italian players) in Serie A. The following players:
Have played at least one Serie A game for the respective club (seasons in which and teams that a player did not collect any caps in Serie A for have NOT been listed).
Have not been capped for the Italian national team on any level, independently from the birthplace, except for players born in San Marino and active in the Italian national team before the first official match of the Sammarinese national team played on 14 November 1990 and players of Italian formation born abroad from Italian parents (so called 'Oriundi').
Have been born in Italy and were capped by a foreign national team. This includes players who have dual citizenship with Italy.

Players are sorted by the State, according to the FIFA eligibility rules: 
They played for in a national team on any level. For footballers that played for two or more national teams it prevails:
The one he played for on A level.
The national team of birth.
If they never played for any national team on any level, it prevails the state of birth. For footballers born in dissolved states prevails the actual state of birth (e.g.: Yugoslavia -> Serbia, Montenegro, Croatia, etc.).

These are all the teams that have had at least one foreign player while playing in a Serie A season. Teams in bold are the ones currently playing in the 2022–23 Serie A season:

Alessandria, Ancona, Ascoli, Atalanta, Avellino, Bari, Benevento, Bologna, Brescia, Cagliari, Carpi, Catania, Catanzaro, Cesena, Chievo, Como, Cremonese, Crotone, Empoli, Fiorentina, Foggia, Frosinone, Genoa, Hellas Verona, Internazionale, Juventus, Lazio, Lecce, Lecco, Legnano, Livorno, Lucchese, Mantova, Messina, Milan, Modena, Monza,  Napoli, Novara, Padova, Palermo, Parma, Perugia, Pescara, Piacenza, Pisa, Pistoiese, Pro Patria, Reggiana, Reggina, Roma, Salernitana, Sampdoria, Sassuolo, Siena, SPAL, Spezia, Torino, Treviso, Triestina, Udinese, Varese, Venezia, Vicenza.

These are the only teams that have participated in Serie A but have not had at least one foreign player:

Casale, Pro Vercelli, Ternana.

In bold: Players still active in Serie A and their respective teams in the current season.

Oriundi and Naturalised players

 – Ermanno Aebi – Inter – 1910–22
 – José Altafini – Milan, Napoli, Juventus – 1958–76
 – Amauri – Napoli, Piacenza, Chievo, Palermo, Juventus, Parma, Fiorentina, Torino – 2000–02, 2003–16
 – André Anderson – Lazio – 2019–20, 2021–22
 – Miguel Andreolo – Bologna, Lazio, Napoli – 1935–48
 – Antonio Angelillo – Inter, Roma, Milan, Lecco, Genoa – 1957–69
 – Emil Audero – Juventus, Sampdoria – 2016–17, 2018–
 – Emilio Badini – Bologna, Spal – 1913–22
 – Cristian Battocchio – Udinese – 2010–12
 – Daniel Bessa – Verona, Genoa – 2017–19, 2020–22
 – Kingsley Boateng – Catania – 2013–14
 – Mauro Camoranesi – Verona, Juventus – 2000–06, 2007–10
 – Renato Cesarini – Juventus – 1929–35
 – Arturo Chini Ludueña – Roma – 1927–34
 – Dino da Costa – Roma, Fiorentina, Atalanta, Juventus – 1955–66
 – Alejandro Demarìa – Lazio – 1931–34
 – Paolo Dellafiore – Treviso, Palermo, Torino, Parma, Cesena, Novara, Siena – 2005–13
 – Attilio Demaria – Inter, Novara, Legnano – 1932–36, 1938–46
 – Alfredo Devincenzi – Inter – 1934–36
  – Nicolao Dumitru – Napoli – 2010–11
 – Éder – Empoli, Brescia, Cesena, Sampdoria, Inter – 2006–07, 2010–18
 – Emerson  (Emerson Palmieri dos Santos)  – Palermo, Roma – 2014–18
 – Ricardo Faccio – Inter – 1933–36
 – Otávio Fantoni – Lazio – 1930–35
 – Francisco Fedullo – Bologna – 1930–39
 – Luiz Felipe – Lazio – 2017–22
 – Emanuele Figliola – Genoa – 1935–38
  – Eddie Firmani – Sampdoria, Inter, Genoa – 1955–63
 – Enrique Flamini – Lazio – 1939–52, 1953–54
 – Fernando Forestieri – Siena, Udinese – 2007–09, 2020–22
 – Francesco Frione – Inter – 1932–35
 – Elisio Gabardo – Milan, Liguria, Genoa – 1935–41
 – Alcides Ghiggia – Roma, Milan – 1953–62
 – Carlos Gringa – Fiorentina, Lucchese – 1932–39
 – Enrique Guaita – Roma – 1933–35
 – Anfilogino Guarisi – Lazio – 1931–37
 – Paolo Innocenti – Bologna, Napoli – 1924–37
 – João Pedro – Palermo, Cagliari – 2010–11, 2014–15, 2016–22
 – Jorginho – Verona, Napoli – 2013–18
 – Cristian Ledesma – Lecce, Lazio – 2001–02, 2003–15
 – Julio Libonatti – Torino, Genoa – 1926–36
 – Francisco Lojacono – Vicenza, Fiorentina, Roma, Sampdoria – 1956–65
 – Leandro Martínez – Parma – 2007–08
 – Rinaldo Martino – Juventus – 1949–50
 – Ernesto Mascheroni – Inter – 1934–36
 – Humberto Maschio – Bologna, Atalanta, Inter, Fiorentina – 1957–66
 – Luis Monti – Juventus – 1930–39
 – Miguel Montuori – Fiorentina – 1956–61
 – Giovanni Moscardini – Lucchese, Pisa, Genoa – 1919–??
 – Thiago Motta – Genoa, Inter – 2008–12
 – Alfonso Negro – Fiorentina, Napoli – 1934–39
 – Brian Oddei – Sassuolo – 2020–22
 – Raimundo Orsi – Juventus – 1928–35
 – Dani Osvaldo – Fiorentina, Bologna, Roma, Juventus, Inter – 2007–10, 2011–15
 – Gabriel Paletta – Parma, Milan, Atalanta – 2010–17
 – Bruno Pesaola – Roma, Novara, Napoli, Genoa – 1947–61
 – Cecilio Pisano – Sampdoria – 1937–38, 1939–40, 1941–43
 – Roberto Porta – Inter – 1934–36
 – Ettore Puricelli – Bologna, Milan – 1938–49
 – Vincenzo Rennella – Cesena – 2011–12
 – Eduardo Ricagni – Juventus, Milan, Torino – 1953–58
 – Rômulo – Fiorentina, Verona, Juventus, Genoa, Lazio, Brescia – 2011–16, 2017–20
 – Humberto Rosa – Sampdoria, Padova, Juventus, Napoli – 1954–64
 – Said – Genoa – 2012–13
 – Attila Sallustro – Napoli – 1925–37
 – Oreste Sallustro – Napoli, Bari – 1929–33, 1934–37
 – Raffaele Sansone – Bologna, Napoli – 1931–45
 – Fabiano Santacroce – Napoli, Parma – 2008–13, 2014–15
 – Ezequiel Schelotto – Cesena, Catania, Atalanta, Inter, Sassuolo, Parma, Chievo – 2010–15, 2018–19
 – Juan Alberto Schiaffino – Milan, Roma – 1954–62
 – Alessandro Scopelli – Roma – 1933–35
 – Pedro Sernagiotto – Juventus – 1932–34
 – Omar Sívori – Juventus, Napoli – 1957–69
 – Angelo Sormani – Mantova, Roma, Sampdoria, Milan, Napoli, Fiorentina, Vicenza – 1961–76
 – Rafael Toloi – Roma, Atalanta – 2013–14, 2015–
 – Victor Tortora – Venezia – 1939–43, 1946–47
 – Ulisse Uslenghi – Livorno, Napoli – 1933–38
 – Giuseppe Wilson – Lazio – 1969–79
 – Kelvin Yeboah – Genoa – 2021–22
 – Maximo Zenildo Zappino – Frosinone – 2015–16

Africa (CAF)

Algeria 
Ishak Belfodil – Bologna, Parma, Inter, Livorno – 2011–15
Samir Beloufa – Milan – 1997–98
Ismaël Bennacer – Empoli, Milan – 2018–
Mohamed Fares – Verona, SPAL, Lazio, Genoa – 2014–16, 2017–
Abdelkader Ghezzal – Siena, Bari, Cesena, Parma – 2008–12, 2014–15
Rachid Ghezzal – Fiorentina – 2019–20 
Faouzi Ghoulam – Napoli – 2013–22
Mehdi Léris – Chievo, Sampdoria – 2017–21, 2022–
Mourad Meghni – Bologna, Lazio – 2002–05, 2007–10
Djamel Mesbah – Lecce, Milan, Parma, Livorno, Sampdoria, Crotone – 2010–17
Adam Ounas – Napoli, Cagliari, Crotone – 2017–19, 2020–23
Saphir Taïder – Bologna, Inter, Sassuolo – 2011–18
Hassan Yebda – Napoli, Udinese – 2010–11, 2013–14
Karim Zedadka – Napoli – 2022–

Angola 
Bastos – Lazio – 2016–21
Bruno Gaspar – Fiorentina – 2017–18
Dolly Menga – Torino – 2012–13
M'Bala Nzola – Spezia – 2020–

Burkina Faso 
Bryan Dabo – Fiorentina, SPAL, Benevento – 2017–21

Cameroon 

André-Frank Zambo Anguissa – Napoli – 2021–
Jean-Claude Billong – Benevento – 2017–18
Enzo Ebosse – Udinese – 2022–
Samuel Eto'o – Inter, Sampdoria – 2009–11, 2014–15
Antonio Ghomsi – Messina – 2006–07
Martin Hongla – Verona – 2021–23
Thomas Job – Sampdoria, Ascoli – 2003–04, 2006–07
Daniel Maa Boumsong – Inter – 2005–06
Patrick Mboma – Cagliari, Parma – 1998–2002
Joseph Minala – Lazio – 2013–14
Nicolas N'Koulou – Torino – 2017–21
Jean-Pierre Nsame – Venezia – 2021–22
Olivier Ntcham – Genoa – 2015–17
François Omam-Biyik – Sampdoria – 1997–98
André Onana – Inter – 2022–
Frank Ongfiang – Venezia – 2001–02
Jérôme Onguéné – Genoa – 2020–21
Augustine Simo – Torino – 1995–96
Rigobert Song – Salernitana – 1998–99
Adrien Tameze – Atalanta, Verona – 2019–
Pierre Womé – Vicenza, Roma, Bologna, Brescia, Inter – 1996–97, 1998–2002, 2004–06

Cape Verde 
Cabral (Cabral Adilson Tavares Varela) – Genoa – 2013–14
Jovane Cabral – Lazio – 2021–22
Alessio Da Cruz – Parma – 2018–19

Central African Republic 
Geoffrey Kondogbia – Inter – 2015–17

Congo 
Dominique Malonga – Torino, Cesena – 2007–08, 2010–12
Senna Miangué – Inter, Cagliari – 2016–18

DR Congo 
Samuel Bastien – Chievo – 2016–18
Giannelli Imbula – Lecce – 2019–20
Gaël Kakuta – Lazio – 2013–14
Pedro Kamata – Bari – 2009–10
Paul-José M'Poku – Cagliari, Chievo – 2014–16
Jason Mayélé – Cagliari, Chievo – 1999–2000, 2001–02
Olivier N'Siabamfumu – Ascoli – 2006–07
Granddi Ngoyi – Palermo – 2014–15
Shabani Nonda – Roma – 2005–06

Egypt 

Hazem Emam – Udinese – 1996–98
Ahmed Hegazy – Fiorentina – 2012–14
Mido – Roma – 2004–05
Hany Said – Bari – 1998–99, 2000–01
Mohamed Salah – Fiorentina, Roma – 2014–17

Equatorial Guinea 
José Machín – Parma, Monza – 2018–19, 2022–
Pedro Obiang – Sampdoria, Sassuolo – 2010–11, 2012–15, 2019–21, 2022–

Eritrea 
Henok Goitom – Udinese – 2004–05

Gabon 
Catilina Aubameyang – Milan – 2002–03
Mario Lemina – Juventus – 2015–17

Gambia 
Musa Barrow – Atalanta, Bologna – 2017–
Assan Ceesay – Lecce – 2022–
Ebrima Colley – Atalanta, Verona, Spezia – 2019–22
Omar Colley – Sampdoria – 2018–23
Ebrima Darboe – Roma – 2020–
Lamin Jallow – Chievo – 2016–17
Musa Juwara – Chievo, Bologna – 2018–21
Ali Sowe – Chievo – 2012–13

Ghana 
Maxwell Acosty – Fiorentina, Chievo, Crotone – 2011–12, 2013–14, 2016–17
Afriyie Acquah – Palermo, Parma, Sampdoria, Torino, Empoli – 2010–19
Felix Afena-Gyan – Roma, Cremonese – 2021–
Daniel Kofi Agyei – Fiorentina – 2009–10
Emmanuel Agyemang-Badu – Udinese, Verona – 2009–17, 2018–20
Augustine Ahinful – Venezia – 1998–99
Masahudu Alhassan – Genoa – 2011–12
Ebenezer Annan – Bologna – 2021–22
Stephen Appiah – Udinese, Parma, Brescia, Juventus, Bologna, Cesena – 1997–2005, 2009–11
Kwadwo Asamoah – Udinese, Juventus, Inter, Cagliari – 2008–21
Kwame Ayew – Lecce – 1993–94
Ahmed Barusso – Roma, Siena – 2007–09
Richmond Boakye – Genoa, Atalanta – 2009–11, 2014–15
Kevin-Prince Boateng – Milan, Sassuolo, Fiorentina – 2010–13, 2015–16, 2018–20
Raman Chibsah – Sassuolo, Frosinone, Benevento – 2013–16, 2017–19
Isaac Cofie – Genoa, Chievo, Carpi – 2009–10, 2012–18
Amadou Diambo – Benevento – 2020–21
Isaac Donkor – Inter – 2014–15
Godfred Donsah – Verona, Cagliari, Bologna – 2013–19
Alfred Duncan – Inter, Livorno, Sampdoria, Sassuolo, Fiorentina, Cagliari – 2012–
Mark Edusei – Sampdoria, Catania – 2004–08
Caleb Ekuban – Genoa – 2021–22
Michael Essien – Milan – 2013–15
Abdullah Fusseini – Torino – 1999–2000
Mohammed Gargo – Udinese – 1996–2002, 2003–04
Bright Gyamfi – Benevento – 2017–18
Asamoah Gyan – Udinese – 2003–04, 2006–08
Emmanuel Gyasi – Spezia – 2020–
Samuel Kuffour – Roma, Livorno – 2005–07
John Mensah – Chievo, Modena – 2002–05
Sulley Muntari – Udinese, Inter, Milan, Pescara – 2002–07, 2008–15, 2016–17
Nicholas Opoku – Udinese – 2018–20
Emmanuel Osei – Livorno – 2004–05
Abédi Pelé – Torino – 1994–96
Amidu Salifu – Fiorentina, Catania – 2010–13
Ibrahim Sulemana – Verona – 2022–
Nana Welbeck – Brescia – 2010–11
Philip Yeboah Ankrah – Verona – 2020–21

Guinea 
Gaston Camara – Inter – 2014–15
Ibrahima Camara – Parma – 2004–06
Mady Camara – Roma – 2022–
Karamoko Cissé – Atalanta, Benevento – 2006–07, 2017–18 
Moustapha Cissé – Atalanta – 2021–22
Kévin Constant – Chievo, Genoa, Milan, Bologna – 2010–14, 2015–16
Amadou Diawara – Bologna, Napoli, Roma – 2015–22

Guinea-Bissau 
Ednilson – Roma – 1999–2000
Carlos Embaló – Palermo – 2016–17

Ivory Coast 

Jean-Daniel Akpa Akpro – Lazio, Empoli – 2020–
Ibrahima Bakayoko – Livorno, Messina – 2005–07
Sol Bamba – Palermo – 2014–15
Jérémie Boga – Sassuolo, Atalanta – 2018–
Drissa Camara – Parma – 2020–21
Amad Diallo – Atalanta – 2019–21
Serge Dié – Reggina – 1999–2000
Koffi Djidji – Torino, Crotone – 2018–
Cyril Domoraud – Inter – 1999–2000
Thierry Doubai – Udinese – 2011–12
Seydou Doumbia – Roma – 2014–15
Seko Fofana – Udinese – 2016–20
Gervinho – Roma, Parma – 2013–16, 2018–21
Assane Demoya Gnoukouri – Inter – 2014–17
Cedric Gondo – Salernitana – 2021–22
Franck Kessié – Atalanta, Milan – 2016–22
Axel Cédric Konan – Lecce, Torino – 2000–02, 2003–07, 2008–09
Ben Lhassine Kone – Torino – 2021–22
Moussa Koné – Atalanta – 2013–14
Christian Kouamé – Genoa, Fiorentina – 2018–21, 2022–
Arnaud Kouyo – Lecce – 2003–04
Saliou Lassissi – Parma, Sampdoria, Fiorentina – 1998–2001
Christian Manfredini – Chievo, Lazio, Perugia – 2001–09
Siriki Sanogo – Benevento – 2017–18, 2020–21
Ibrahiman Scandroglio – Empoli – 1998–99
Alassane Sidibe – Atalanta – 2021–22
Wilfried Singo – Torino – 2019–
Tallo – Roma – 2011–12
Chaka Traorè – Parma – 2020–21
Hamed Junior Traorè – Empoli, Sassuolo – 2018–23
François Zahoui – Ascoli – 1981–83
Marco Zoro – Messina – 2004–07

Kenya 
McDonald Mariga – Parma, Inter – 2007–08, 2009–13, 2014–15

Liberia 
George Weah – Milan – 1995–2000

Libya 
Ahmad Benali – Pescara, Crotone – 2016–18, 2020–21
Jehad Muntasser – Treviso – 2005–06
Al-Saadi Gaddafi – Perugia, Udinese – 2003–04, 2005–06

Mali 
Abdoulaye Camara – Udinese – 1999–2000
Lassana Coulibaly – Salernitana – 2021–
Cheick Diabaté – Benevento – 2017–18
Souleymane Diamoutene – Perugia, Lecce, Roma, Bari – 2003–06, 2008–12
Drissa Diarra – Lecce – 2003–05
Cheick Keita – Bologna – 2017–18
Seydou Keita – Roma – 2014–16
Mamadou Samassa – Chievo – 2012–14
Mohamed Sissoko – Juventus, Fiorentina – 2007–11, 2012–13
Alassane També – Genoa – 2014–15
Bakaye Traoré – Milan – 2012–13
Molla Wagué – Udinese – 2014–19

Mauritania 
Souleymane Doukara – Catania – 2012–14

Morocco 

Jamal Alioui – Perugia – 2003–04
Sofyan Amrabat – Verona, Fiorentina – 2019–
Mehdi Benatia – Udinese, Roma, Juventus – 2010–14, 2016–19
Zakarya Bergdich – Genoa – 2014–15
Soufiane Bidaoui – Parma – 2014–15
Mehdi Bourabia – Sassuolo, Spezia – 2018–
Ouasim Bouy – Palermo – 2016–17
Manuel da Costa – Fiorentina, Sampdoria – 2008–09
Mounir El Hamdaoui – Fiorentina – 2012–13, 2014–15
Moestafa El Kabir – Cagliari – 2011–12
Omar El Kaddouri – Napoli, Torino, Empoli – 2012–17
Abdelhamid El Kaoutari – Palermo – 2015–16
Jawad El Yamiq – Genoa – 2017–18, 2019–20
Zouhair Feddal – Palermo, Parma – 2014–15
Abdou Harroui – Sassuolo – 2021–
Achraf Hakimi – Inter – 2020–21
Abderrazak Jadid – Brescia, Parma – 2002–03, 2004–05, 2011–12
Omar Khailoti – Bologna – 2020–21
Houssine Kharja – Roma, Siena, Genoa, Inter, Fiorentina – 2005–06, 2007–12
Sofian Kiyine – Chievo, Venezia – 2016–17, 2018–19, 2021–22
Achraf Lazaar – Palermo, Benevento – 2014–16, 2017–18
Kévin Malcuit – Napoli, Fiorentina – 2018–22
Youssef Maleh – Fiorentina, Lecce – 2021–
Ibrahim Maroufi – Inter – 2006–07
Adam Masina – Bologna, Udinese – 2015–18, 2022–
Rachid Neqrouz – Bari – 1997–2001
Mounir Obbadi – Verona – 2014–15
Abdelilah Saber – Napoli – 2000–01
Abdelhamid Sabiri – Sampdoria – 2021–
Adel Taarabt – Milan, Genoa – 2013–14, 2016–18

Nigeria 

Daniel Adejo – Reggina – 2008–09
Ola Aina – Torino – 2018–20, 2021–
Akande Ajide – Roma – 2003–04
Mohammed Aliyu – Milan – 1998–2000
Ibrahim Babatunde – Piacenza – 2002–03
Cyriel Dessers – Cremonese – 2022–
Osarimen Ebagua – Catania – 2011–12
Tyronne Ebuehi – Venezia, Empoli – 2021–
Kingsley Ehizibue – Udinese – 2022–
Hugo Enyinnaya – Bari – 1999–2001
Odion Ighalo – Udinese, Cesena – 2008–09, 2010–11
Ikechukwu Kalu – Sampdoria – 2007–08
Nwankwo Kanu – Inter – 1997–99
Ademola Lookman – Atalanta – 2022–
Stephen Makinwa – Modena, Atalanta, Palermo, Lazio, Reggina, Chievo – 2003–10
Obafemi Martins – Inter – 2002–06
Jerry Mbakogu – Carpi – 2015–16
Kingsley Michael – Bologna – 2019–20, 2021–22
Victor Moses – Inter – 2019–20
Joel Obi – Inter, Parma, Torino, Chievo, Salernitana – 2010–19, 2021–22
Victor Obinna – Chievo, Inter – 2005–07, 2008–09, 2013–14
Nwankwo Obiora – Inter, Parma – 2010–12
Christian Obodo – Perugia, Fiorentina, Udinese, Lecce – 2001–10, 2011–12
Michael Odibe – Siena – 2009–10
Nnamdi Oduamadi – Milan – 2010–11
Edward Ofere – Lecce – 2010–12
David Okereke – Venezia, Cremonese – 2021–
Orji Okwonkwo – Bologna – 2016–19
Sunday Oliseh – Reggiana, Juventus – 1994–95, 1999–2000
Mathew Olorunleke – Messina – 2005–06
Akeem Omolade – Torino – 2002–03
Ogenyi Onazi – Lazio – 2011–16
 Victor Osimhen – Napoli – 2020–
Umar Sadiq – Roma, Bologna, Torino – 2015–18
Nwankwo Simy – Crotone, Salernitana – 2016–18, 2020–22
Isaac Success – Udinese – 2021–
Taye Taiwo – Milan – 2011–12
William Troost-Ekong – Udinese, Salernitana – 2018–20, 2022–
Adewale Wahab – Roma – 2003–04
Taribo West – Inter, Milan – 1997–2000
Kenneth Zeigbo – Venezia – 1998–99

Réunion 
Samuel Souprayen – Verona – 2015–16, 2017–18 dual French international

Senegal 

Khouma Babacar – Fiorentina, Sassuolo, Lecce – 2009–12, 2014–20
Fodé Ballo-Touré – Milan – 2021–
Issa Cissokho – Genoa – 2015–16
Ferdinand Coly – Perugia, Parma – 2003–04, 2005–08
Mamadou Coulibaly – Pescara, Udinese, Salernitana – 2016–17, 2020–22
Boulaye Dia – Salernitana – 2022–
Abdou Diakhaté – Parma – 2018–19
Djibril Diawara – Torino – 1999–2000
Abou Diop – Torino – 2012–13
Assane Dioussé – Empoli, Chievo – 2015–17, 2018–19
N'Diaye Djiby – Chievo – 2012–13
Diaw Doudou – Torino – 2006–07
Boukary Dramé – Chievo, Atalanta, SPAL – 2011–18
Ricardo Faty – Roma – 2006–07, 2009–10
Alfred Gomis – SPAL – 2017–19
Lys Gomis – Torino – 2013–14
Diomansy Kamara – Modena – 2002–04
Mamadou Kanoute – Benevento – 2017–18
Baldé Keita – Lazio, Inter, Sampdoria, Cagliari – 2013–17, 2018–19, 2020–22
Moussa Konaté – Genoa – 2013–14
Kalidou Koulibaly – Napoli – 2014–22
Ibrahima Mbaye – Livorno, Inter, Bologna – 2013–22
Maodo Malick Mbaye – Chievo – 2013–14
David Mbodj – Pescara – 2012–13
Roger Mendy – Pescara – 1992–93
M'Baye Niang – Milan, Genoa, Torino – 2012–18
Welle Ossou – Livorno – 2009–10
Mohamed Sarr – Milan – 2001–02
Demba Seck – Torino – 2021–
Demba Thiam – SPAL – 2019–20
Mame Baba Thiam – Empoli – 2016–17
Mamadou Tounkara – Lazio – 2013–14, 2016–17
Armand Traoré – Juventus – 2010–11
Papa Waigo – Genoa, Fiorentina, Lecce – 2007–09, 2010–11

Sierra Leone 
Kewullay Conteh – Atalanta, Venezia, Palermo – 1995–96, 2001–02, 2004–07
Mohamed Kallon – Bologna, Cagliari, Reggina, Vicenza, Inter – 1997–2004
Yayah Kallon – Genoa, Verona – 2020–
Augustus Kargbo – Crotone – 2020–21
Rodney Strasser – Milan, Lecce, Parma – 2008–13

Somalia 
Ayub Daud – Juventus – 2008–09
Abel Gigli – Parma – 2009–10

South Africa 
Mark Fish – Lazio – 1996–97
Philemon Masinga – Bari – 1997–2001
Siyabonga Nomvethe – Udinese – 2001–02, 2003–04
David Nyathi – Cagliari – 1998–99
Eric Tinkler – Cagliari – 1996–97
Joel Untersee – Empoli – 2018–19

Togo 
Wisdom Amey – Bologna – 2020-
Serge Gakpé – Genoa, Atalanta, Chievo – 2015–17

Tunisia 
Tijani Belaid – Inter – 2004–05
Yohan Benalouane – Cesena, Parma, Atalanta – 2010–15
Dylan Bronn – Salernitana – 2022–
Wajdi Kechrida – Salernitana – 2021–22
Karim Laribi – Sassuolo – 2013–14, 2015–16
Karim Saidi – Lecce – 2005–06

Zambia 
Lameck Banda – Lecce – 2022–

Asia (AFC)

Australia  

John Aloisi – Cremonese – 1995–96
Mark Bresciano – Parma, Palermo, Lazio – 2002–11
Joshua Brillante – Fiorentina, Empoli – 2014–15
Frank Farina – Bari – 1991–92
Bruno Fornaroli – Sampdoria – 2008–09, 2010–11
Vincenzo Grella – Empoli, Parma, Torino – 1998–99, 2002–08
Ajdin Hrustic – Verona – 2022–
Zeljko Kalac – Perugia, Milan – 2002–04, 2005–09
Paul Okon – Lazio, Fiorentina – 1996–97, 1998–2000
Trent Sainsbury – Inter – 2016–17
James Troisi – Atalanta – 2012–13

Iran 
Rahman Rezaei – Perugia, Messina, Livorno – 2001–03, 2004–08
Ali Samereh – Perugia – 2001–02

Iraq 
Ali Adnan – Udinese, Atalanta – 2015–19

Japan 

Keisuke Honda – Milan – 2013–17
Kazuyoshi Miura – Genoa – 1994–95
Takayuki Morimoto – Catania, Novara – 2006–13
Yuto Nagatomo – Cesena, Inter – 2010–18
Shunsuke Nakamura – Reggina – 2002–05
Hidetoshi Nakata – Perugia, Roma, Parma, Bologna, Fiorentina – 1998–2005
Hiroshi Nanami – Venezia – 1999–2000
Mitsuo Ogasawara – Messina – 2006–07
Masashi Oguro – Torino – 2006–08
Takehiro Tomiyasu – Bologna – 2019–22
Atsushi Yanagisawa – Sampdoria, Messina – 2003–06
Maya Yoshida – Sampdoria – 2019–22

North Korea 
Han Kwang-song – Cagliari – 2016–18

South Korea 
Ahn Jung-hwan – Perugia – 2000–02
Kim Min-jae – Napoli – 2022–
Lee Seung-woo – Verona – 2017–18

Uzbekistan 
Eldor Shomurodov – Genoa, Roma, Spezia– 2020–
Ilyos Zeytulayev – Reggina – 2004–06

Europe (UEFA)

Albania 
Arlind Ajeti – Frosinone, Torino, Crotone – 2015–18
Kristjan Asllani – Empoli, Inter – 2021–
Nedim Bajrami – Empoli, Sassuolo – 2021–
Migjen Basha – Torino – 2012–15
Etrit Berisha – Lazio, Atalanta, SPAL, Torino – 2013–20, 2021–
Erjon Bogdani – Reggina, Verona, Siena, Chievo, Livorno, Cesena – 1999–2001, 2002–03, 2005–13
Loro Boriçi – Lazio – 1941–43
Lorik Cana – Lazio – 2011–15
Edgar Çani – Palermo, Catania – 2007–08, 2012–13
Kastriot Dermaku – Parma, Lecce – 2019–21, 2022–
Berat Djimsiti – Atalanta, Benevento – 2015–16, 2017–
Elseid Hysaj – Empoli, Napoli, Lazio – 2014–
Ardian Ismajli – Spezia, Empoli – 2020–
Naim Krieziu – Roma, Napoli – 1939–43, 1945–48, 1950–52 
Marash Kumbulla – Verona, Roma – 2019–
Andi Lila – Parma – 2014–15
Rey Manaj – Inter, Pescara, Spezia – 2015–17, 2021–22
Agon Mehmeti – Palermo – 2011–12
Ledian Memushaj – Pescara, Benevento – 2016–18
Emanuele Ndoj – Brescia – 2019–20
Angelo Ndrecka – Chievo – 2018–19
Xhulian Rrudho – Chievo – 2006–07
Ervin Skela – Ascoli – 2006–07
Thomas Strakosha – Lazio – 2016–22
Igli Tare – Brescia, Bologna, Lazio – 2000–08
Frédéric Veseli – Empoli, Salernitana – 2016–17, 2018–19, 2021–22
Giacomo Vrioni – Juventus – 2019–21

Armenia 
Henrikh Mkhitaryan – Roma, Inter – 2019–

Austria 

Emanuel Aiwu – Cremonese – 2022–
Marko Arnautović – Inter, Bologna – 2009–10, 2021–
Flavius Daniliuc – Salernitana – 2022–
György Garics – Napoli, Atalanta, Bologna – 2007–14
Robert Gucher – Frosinone – 2015–16
Michael Hatz – Reggiana, Lecce – 1996–98
Erwin Hoffer – Napoli – 2009–10
Robert Ibertsberger – Venezia – 1999–2000
Arnel Jakupović – Empoli – 2016–17
Engelbert König – Fiorentina, Lazio, Sampdoria, Genoa – 1940–41, 1942–43, 1945–50
Michael Konsel – Roma, Venezia – 1997–2000
Valentino Lazaro – Inter, Torino – 2019–20, 2022–
Alex Manninger – Fiorentina, Torino, Siena, Juventus – 2001–03, 2004–05, 2006–10
Dieter Mirnegg – Como – 1981–82
Ernst Ocwirk – Sampdoria – 1956–61
Anton Polster – Torino – 1987–88
Stefan Posch – Bologna – 2022–
Herbert Prohaska – Inter, Roma – 1980–83
Jürgen Prutsch – Livorno – 2009–10
Jürgen Säumel – Torino – 2008–09
Walter Schachner – Cesena, Torino, Avellino – 1981–88
David Schnegg – Venezia – 2021–22
Markus Schopp – Brescia – 2001–05
Lukas Spendlhofer – Inter – 2012–13
Michael Svoboda – Venezia – 2021–22
Maximilian Ullmann – Venezia – 2021–22

Belarus 
Sergei Aleinikov – Juventus, Lecce – 1989–91 ( while active)
Sergei Gurenko – Roma, Parma, Piacenza – 1999–2000, 2001–03
Vitali Kutuzov – Milan, Sampdoria, Parma, Bari – 2001–02, 2004–07, 2009–11
Mikhail Sivakov – Cagliari – 2009–11

Belgium 

Walter Baseggio – Treviso – 2005–06
Maxime Busi – Parma – 2020–21
Timothy Castagne – Atalanta – 2017–20
Luis Pedro Cavanda – Lazio – 2010–15
Ludo Coeck – Inter – 1983–84
Bertrand Crasson – Napoli – 1996–98
Charles De Ketelaere – Milan – 2022–
Koni De Winter – Empoli – 2022–
Stéphane Demol – Bologna – 1988–89
Daan Dierckx – Parma – 2020–21
Noë Dussenne – Crotone – 2016–18
Daam Foulon – Benevento – 2020–21
Régis Genaux – Udinese – 1996–2001
Eric Gerets – Milan – 1983–84
Jean-François Gillet – Bari, Bologna, Torino – 2000–01, 2009–13, 2014–15
Georges Grün – Parma, Reggiana – 1990–94, 1996–97
Daan Heymans – Venezia – 2021–22
Sven Kums – Udinese – 2016–17
Maxime Lestienne – Genoa – 2014–15
Jordan Lukaku – Lazio – 2016–20
Romelu Lukaku – Inter – 2019–21, 2022–
Dries Mertens – Napoli – 2013–22
Kevin Mirallas – Fiorentina – 2018–19
Gaby Mudingayi – Lazio, Bologna, Inter, Cesena – 2005–15
Radja Nainggolan – Cagliari, Roma, Inter – 2009–21
Cyril Ngonge – Verona – 2022–
Luís Oliveira – Cagliari, Fiorentina, Bologna – 1992–2001
Stephane Omeonga – Genoa – 2017–19
Divock Origi – Milan – 2022–
Daouda Peeters – Juventus – 2019–20
Dennis Praet – Sampdoria, Torino – 2016–19, 2021–22
Silvio Proto – Lazio – 2018–19
Alexis Saelemaekers – Milan – 2019–
Vincenzo Scifo – Inter, Torino – 1987–88, 1991–93
Francis Severeyns – Pisa – 1988–89
Arthur Theate – Bologna – 2021–22
Anthony Vanden Borre – Fiorentina, Genoa – 2007–09
René Vandereycken – Genoa – 1981–83
Zinho Vanheusden – Genoa – 2021–22
Thomas Vermaelen – Roma – 2016–17
Patrick Vervoort – Ascoli – 1991–92
Aster Vranckx – Milan – 2022–
Johan Walem – Udinese, Parma – 1997–2001

Bosnia-Herzegovina 

Mustafa Arslanović – Ascoli – 1988–90 ( while active)
Riad Bajić – Udinese – 2017–18
Asmir Begović – Milan – 2019–20
Milan Đurić – Cesena, Salernitana, Verona – 2014–15, 2021–
Edin Džeko – Roma, Inter – 2015–
Amer Gojak – Torino – 2020–21
Vinko Golob – Venezia – 1949–50 ( while active)
Mato Jajalo – Siena, Palermo, Udinese – 2009–10, 2014–17, 2019–23
Davor Jozić – Cesena – 1987–91 ( while active)
Rade Krunić – Empoli, Milan – 2015–17, 2018–
Senad Lulić – Lazio – 2011–21
Hrvoje Miličević – Pescara – 2016–17
Vedin Musić – Como, Modena, Torino – 2002–04, 2006–07
Zlatan Muslimović – Udinese, Messina, Parma, Atalanta – 2000–01, 2005–08
Enis Nadarević – Genoa – 2012–13
Daniel Pavlović – Frosinone, Sampdoria, Crotone – 2015–18
Miralem Pjanić – Roma, Juventus – 2011–20
Sanjin Prcić – Torino – 2015–16
Hasan Salihamidžić – Juventus – 2007–11
Haris Škoro – Torino – 1988–89, 1990–91 ( while active)
Blaž Slišković – Pescara – 1987–88, 1992–93 ( while active)
Ćazim Suljić – Crotone – 2016–17
Toni Šunjić – Palermo – 2016–17
Benjamin Tahirović – Roma – 2022–
Petar Zovko – Spezia – 2021–
Ervin Zukanović – Chievo, Sampdoria, Roma, Atalanta, Genoa, SPAL – 2014–20

Bulgaria 

Valentin Antov – Bologna, Monza – 2020–21, 2022–
Valeri Bojinov – Lecce, Fiorentina, Parma – 2001–02, 2003–06, 2009–12
Ivaylo Chochev – Palermo – 2014–17
Kiril Despodov – Cagliari – 2018–19, 2020–21
Andrey Galabinov – Genoa, Spezia – 2017–18, 2020–21
Petko Hristov – Spezia – 2021–23
Nikolay Iliev – Bologna – 1989–91
Hristo Stoichkov – Parma – 1995–96
Aleksandar Tonev – Frosinone, Crotone – 2015–18

Croatia  

Aljoša Asanović – Napoli – 1997–98
Milan Badelj – Fiorentina, Lazio, Genoa – 2014–22
Ricardo Bagadur – Fiorentina – 2014–15
Andrija Balić – Udinese – 2016–19
Zoran Ban – Juventus – 1993–94
Toma Bašić – Lazio – 2021–
Filip Benković – Udinese – 2021–22
 Kristijan Bistrović – Lecce – 2022–23
Saša Bjelanović – Como, Chievo, Lecce, Ascoli, Torino – 2002–03, 2004–08
Zvonimir Boban – Bari, Milan – 1991–2001 ( while active)
Luka Bogdan – Salernitana – 2021–22
Alen Bokšić – Lazio, Juventus – 1993–2000
Domagoj Bradarić – Salernitana – 2022–
Filip Bradarić – Cagliari – 2018–19
Elvis Brajković – Verona – 1996–97
Josip Brekalo – Torino, Fiorentina – 2021–
Petar Brlek – Genoa – 2017–18
Dražen Brnčić – Milan, Vicenza – 2000–01
Marcelo Brozović – Inter – 2014–
Igor Bubnjić – Udinese, Carpi – 2013–16
Ante Budimir – Sampdoria, Crotone – 2016–18
Igor Budan – Venezia, Atalanta, Ascoli, Parma, Palermo, Cesena – 1999–2000, 2001–02, 2004–13
Davor Čop – Empoli – 1987–88 ( while active)
Duje Čop – Cagliari – 2014–15, 2017–18
Ante Ćorić  – Roma – 2018–19
Mario Cvitanović – Verona, Venezia – 2000–02
Damjan Đoković – Cesena – 2011–12
Tomislav Erceg – Perugia – 1998–99
Martin Erlić – Spezia, Sassuolo – 2020–
Tomislav Gomelt – Crotone – 2020–21
Robert Jarni – Bari, Torino, Juventus – 1991–92, 1993–95 ( while active)
Ivan Javorčić – Brescia – 1997–98
Tin Jedvaj – Roma – 2013–14
Krunoslav Jurčić – Torino – 1999–2000
Ivan Jurić – Genoa – 2007–10
Nikola Kalinić – Fiorentina, Milan, Roma, Verona – 2015–18, 2019–22
Veldin Karić – Torino – 1995–96
Ivan Kelava – Udinese – 2013–14
Dario Knežević – Livorno, Juventus – 2006–10
Robert Kovač – Juventus – 2005–06
Mateo Kovačić – Inter – 2012–15
Miljenko Kovačić – Brescia – 1997–98
Karlo Letica – SPAL, Sampdoria – 2019–21
Marko Livaja – Cesena, Inter, Atalanta, Empoli – 2011–14, 2015–16
Mario Mandžukić – Juventus,  Milan – 2015–19, 2020–21
Ivan Martić – Verona – 2014–15
Frane Matošić – Bologna – 1942–43 ( while active)
Hrvoje Milić – Fiorentina – 2016–17
Zvonko Monsider – Padova – 1949–50 ( while active)
Nikola Moro – Bologna – 2022–
Robert Murić – Pescara – 2016–17
Marko Pajač – Cagliari, Empoli, Genoa – 2016–17, 2018–20
Manuel Pamić – Chievo – 2013–14
Ivor Pandur – Verona – 2020–22
Mario Pašalić – Milan, Atalanta – 2016–17, 2018–
Stipe Perica – Udinese, Frosinone – 2014–19
Ivan Perišić – Inter – 2015–19, 2020–22
Bruno Petković – Catania, Bologna, Verona – 2012–14, 2016–18
Marko Pjaca – Juventus, Fiorentina, Genoa, Torino, Empoli – 2016–17, 2018–19, 2020–
Marin Pongračić – Lecce – 2022–
Josip Posavec – Palermo – 2015–17
Nenad Pralija – Reggina – 1999–2000
Franjo Prce – Lazio – 2016–17
Josip Radošević – Napoli – 2013–15
Milan Rapaić – Perugia, Ancona – 1996–97, 1998–2000, 2003–04
Ante Rebić – Fiorentina, Verona, Milan – 2013–14, 2015–16, 2019–
Marko Rog – Napoli, Cagliari – 2016–22
Tomislav Rukavina – Venezia – 1999–2000, 2001–02
Adrian Šemper – Chievo, Genoa – 2018–19, 2021–22
Anthony Šerić – Verona, Brescia, Parma, Lazio – 1999–2005
Dario Šimić – Inter, Milan – 1998–2008
Lorenco Šimić – SPAL – 2017–19
Dario Smoje – Milan – 1997–98
Robert Špehar – Verona – 1999–2000
Darijo Srna – Cagliari – 2018–19
Mario Stanić – Parma – 1996–2000
Ivan Strinić – Napoli, Sampdoria – 2014–18
Ivo Šuprina – Napoli – 1950–51 ( while active)
Ivica Šurjak – Udinese – 1982–83 ( while active)
Boško Šutalo – Atalanta, Verona – 2019–22
Stjepan Tomas – Vicenza, Como – 2000–01, 2002–03
Goran Tomić – Vicenza – 2000–01
Igor Tudor – Juventus, Siena – 1998–2006
Ivan Vargić – Lazio – 2016–17
Goran Vlaović – Padova – 1994–96
Nikola Vlašić – Torino – 2022–
Šime Vrsaljko – Genoa, Sassuolo, Inter – 2013–16, 2018–19
Davor Vugrinec – Lecce, Atalanta – 2000–03
Bernard Vukas – Bologna – 1957–59 ( while active)
Dragan Vukoja – Salernitana – 1998–99
Ante Vukušić – Pescara – 2012–13
Tonči Žilić – Verona – 1999–2000
Dario Župarić – Pescara – 2016–17

Cyprus  
Grigoris Kastanos – Pescara, Juventus, Salernitana – 2016–17, 2018–19, 2021–

Czech Republic  

Antonín Barák – Udinese, Lecce, Verona, Fiorentina – 2017–
Ondřej Čelůstka – Palermo – 2009–10
Zdeněk Grygera – Juventus – 2007–11
Josef Hušbauer – Cagliari – 2014–15
Jakub Jankto – Udinese, Sampdoria – 2016–21
Marek Jankulovski – Napoli, Udinese, Milan – 2000–01, 2002–11
Lukáš Jarolím – Siena – 2007–10
Martin Jiránek – Reggina – 2000–01, 2002–04
Josef Kaiml – Triestina – 1951–52 ( while active)
Václav Koloušek – Salernitana – 1998–99
Libor Kozák – Lazio – 2008–09, 2010–13
Ladislav Krejčí – Bologna – 2016–20
Luboš Kubík – Fiorentina – 1989–91 ( while active)
Martin Lejsal – Reggina – 2002–04
Mario Lička – Livorno – 2004–05
David Limberský – Modena – 2003–04
Aleš Matějů – Brescia, Venezia – 2019–20, 2021–22
Pavel Nedvěd – Lazio, Juventus – 1996–2006, 2007–09
Jaroslav Plašil – Catania – 2013–14
Karel Poborský – Lazio – 2000–02
Daniel Pudil – Cesena – 2011–12
Michael Rabušic – Verona – 2013–14
Tomáš Řepka – Fiorentina – 1998–2002
David Rozehnal – Lazio – 2007–09
Patrik Schick – Sampdoria, Roma – 2016–19
Stefan Simić – Crotone – 2017–18
Tomáš Sivok – Udinese – 2006–08
Tomáš Skuhravý – Genoa – 1990–95 ( while active)
Pavel Srníček – Brescia – 2000–03
Tomáš Ujfaluši – Fiorentina – 2004–08
Kamil Vacek – Chievo – 2011–13
Lukáš Vorlický – Atalanta – 2022–
Čestmír Vycpálek – Juventus, Palermo – 1946–47, 1948–52 ( while active)
Matěj Vydra – Udinese – 2010–11
Tomáš Zápotočný – Udinese – 2006–08
David Zima – Torino – 2021–
Jaromír Zmrhal – Brescia – 2019–20

Denmark  

Oliver Abildgaard – Verona – 2022–
Joachim Andersen – Sampdoria – 2017–19
Peter Ankersen – Genoa – 2019–20
Julius Beck – Spezia – 2022–
Nicklas Bendtner – Juventus – 2012–13
Nils Bennike – Spal, Genoa – 1951–54
Klaus Berggreen – Pisa, Roma, Torino – 1982–84, 1985–88
Martin Bergvold – Livorno – 2006–08, 2009–10
Morten Bisgaard – Udinese – 1998–2001
Helge Bronée – Palermo, Roma, Juventus, Novara – 1950–56
Kurt Christensen – Atalanta, Lazio, Catania – 1961–66
Anders Christiansen – Chievo – 2014–15
Hans Colberg – Lucchese – 1950–52
Andreas Cornelius – Atalanta, Parma – 2017–18, 2019–21
Mikkel Damsgaard – Sampdoria – 2020–22
Riza Durmisi – Lazio – 2018–19
Preben Elkjær – Verona – 1984–88
Christian Eriksen – Inter – 2019–21
Kai Frandsen – Lucchese – 1951–52
Morten Frendrup – Genoa – 2021–22
Allan Gaarde – Udinese – 2000–01
Christian Gytkjær – Monza – 2022–
John Hansen – Juventus, Lazio – 1948–55
Karl Aage Hansen – Atalanta, Juventus, Sampdoria, Catania – 1949–55
Svend Jørgen Hansen – Atalanta, Pro Patria – 1950–53
Thomas Helveg – Udinese, Milan, Inter – 1993–94, 1995–2004
Morten Hjulmand – Lecce – 2022–
Rasmus Højlund – Atalanta – 2022–
Daniel Jensen – Novara – 2011–12
Ivan Jensen – Bologna – 1949–56
Per Jensen – Triestina – 1954–55
Martin Jørgensen – Udinese, Fiorentina – 1997–2010
Christian Keller – Lazio – 2005–06
Simon Kjær – Palermo, Roma, Atalanta, Milan – 2008–10, 2011–12, 2019–
Peter Knudsen – Bari – 1998–99
Per Krøldrup – Udinese, Fiorentina, Pescara – 2001–11, 2012–13
Henrik Larsen – Pisa – 1990–91
Brian Laudrup – Fiorentina, Milan – 1992–94
Michael Laudrup – Lazio, Juventus – 1983–89
Martin Laursen – Verona, Milan – 1999–2004
Lukas Lerager – Genoa – 2018–21
Christian Lønstrup – Cagliari – 1996–97
Michael Madsen – Bari – 1998–2001
Joakim Mæhle – Atalanta – 2020–
Simon Makienok – Palermo – 2014–15
Leif Mortensen – Udinese – 1961–62
Flemming Nielsen – Atalanta – 1961–64
Harald Nielsen – Bologna, Inter, Napoli, Sampdoria – 1961–70
Matti Lund Nielsen – Pescara – 2012–13
Nicki Bille Nielsen – Reggina – 2006–07
Christian Nørgaard – Fiorentina – 2018–19
Marc Nygaard – Brescia – 2004–05
Jens Odgaard – Sassuolo – 2018–19
Dion Ørnvold – Spal – 1951–52
Axel Pilmark – Bologna – 1950–59
Johannes Pløger – Juventus, Novara, Torino, Udinese – 1948–54
Christian Poulsen – Juventus – 2008–10
Simon Poulsen – Sampdoria – 2012–13
Karl Aage Præst – Juventus, Lazio – 1949–57
Jacob Rasmussen – Empoli – 2018–19
Poul Aage Rasmussen – Atalanta – 1952–56
Lasse Schöne – Genoa – 2019–20
John Sivebæk – Pescara – 1992–93
Søren Skov – Avellino – 1982–83
Andreas Skov Olsen – Bologna – 2019–22
Erling Sørensen – Udinese, Triestina – 1950–55
Frederik Sørensen – Juventus, Bologna, Verona – 2010–15
Jørgen Leschly Sørensen – Atalanta, Milan – 1949–55
Kris Stadsgaard – Reggina – 2007–08
Jens Stryger Larsen – Udinese – 2017–22
Thomas Thorninger – Udinese – 2001–02
Jon Dahl Tomasson – Milan – 2002–05
Mike Tullberg – Reggina – 2007–08
Magnus Warming – Torino – 2021–22
Niki Zimling – Udinese – 2008–10

England  

 Tammy Abraham – Roma – 2021–
Charles Adcock – Padova, Triestina – 1948–50
Joe Baker – Torino – 1961–62
David Beckham – Milan – 2008–10
Luis Binks – Bologna – 2021–22
Luther Blissett – Milan – 1983–84
Jay Bothroyd – Perugia – 2003–04
Franz Carr – Reggiana – 1996–97
Nathaniel Chalobah – Napoli – 2015–16
Ashley Cole – Roma – 2014–15
Gordon Cowans – Bari – 1985–86
Danny Dichio – Lecce – 1997–98
Paul Elliott – Pisa – 1987–89
Trevor Francis – Sampdoria, Atalanta – 1982–87
Paul Gascoigne – Lazio – 1992–95
Jimmy Greaves – Milan – 1961–62
Joe Hart – Torino – 2016–17
Mark Hateley – Milan – 1984–87
Gerry Hitchens – Inter, Torino, Atalanta, Cagliari – 1961–69
Samuel Iling-Junior – Juventus – 2022–
Paul Ince – Inter – 1995–97
William Jordan – Juventus – 1948–49
Ainsley Maitland-Niles – Roma – 2021–22
Anthony Marchi – Vicenza, Torino – 1957–59
Stephy Mavididi – Juventus – 2018–19
David Platt – Bari, Juventus, Sampdoria – 1991–95
Micah Richards – Fiorentina – 2014–15
Paul Rideout – Bari – 1985–86
Lee Sharpe – Sampdoria – 1998–99
Chris Smalling – Roma – 2019–
Fikayo Tomori – Milan – 2020–
Axel Tuanzebe – Napoli – 2021–22
Ronaldo Vieira – Sampdoria, Verona, Torino – 2018–
Des Walker – Sampdoria – 1992–93
Ray Wilkins – Milan – 1984–87
Ben Wilmot – Udinese – 2018–19
Harry Winks – Sampdoria – 2022–
Ashley Young – Inter – 2019–21

Estonia  
 Ragnar Klavan – Cagliari – 2018–21
 Georgi Tunjov – SPAL – 2019–20

Finland  
Mika Aaltonen – Bologna – 1988–89
Alexei Eremenko – Lecce – 2004–06
Roman Eremenko – Udinese, Siena – 2006–08
Përparim Hetemaj – Brescia, Chievo, Benevento – 2010–19, 2020–21
Anssi Jaakkola – Siena – 2007–08
Jesse Joronen – Brescia – 2019–20
Mika Lehkosuo – Perugia – 1998–99
Niki Mäenpää – Venezia – 2021–22
Niklas Moisander –  Sampdoria – 2015–16
Niklas Pyyhtiä – Bologna – 2021–
Roope Riski – Cesena – 2010–11
Simon Skrabb – Brescia – 2019–20
Sauli Väisänen – SPAL – 2017–18
Jani Virtanen – Udinese – 2006–07

France

Georgia  
Kakha Kaladze – Milan, Genoa – 2000–12
Khvicha Kvaratskhelia – Napoli – 2022–
Luka Lochoshvili – Cremonese – 2022–
Levan Mchedlidze – Palermo, Empoli – 2008–10, 2014–17, 2018–19

Germany  

Nadiem Amiri – Genoa – 2021–22
Tolgay Arslan – Udinese – 2020–
Dietmar Beiersdorfer – Reggiana – 1996–97
Thomas Berthold – Verona, Roma – 1987–91
Oliver Bierhoff – Ascoli, Udinese, Milan, Chievo – 1991–92, 1995–2001, 2002–03
Manfred Binz – Brescia – 1997–98
Andreas Brehme – Inter – 1988–92
Hans-Peter Briegel – Verona, Sampdoria – 1984–88
Albert Brülls – Modena, Brescia – 1962–64, 1965–68
Horst Buhtz – Torino – 1952–56
Emre Can – Juventus – 2018–20
Julian Chabot – Sampdoria, Spezia – 2019–22
Lennart Czyborra – Atalanta, Genoa – 2019–21
Marvin Compper – Fiorentina – 2012–14
Diego Demme – Napoli – 2019–
Thomas Doll – Lazio, Bari – 1991–94, 1997–98
Stefan Effenberg – Fiorentina – 1992–93
Gianluca Gaudino – Chievo – 2017–18
Rolf Geiger – Mantova – 1962–63
Giuseppe Gemiti – Udinese, Chievo, Novara, Livorno – 2002–04, 2005–06, 2011–12, 2013–14
Mario Gómez – Fiorentina – 2013–15
Robin Gosens – Atalanta, Inter – 2017–
André Gumprecht – Lecce – 1993–94
Sinan Gümüş – Genoa – 2019–20
Koray Günter – Genoa, Verona, Sampdoria – 2018–
Helmut Haller – Bologna, Juventus – 1962–73
Thomas Häßler – Juventus, Roma – 1990–94
Jörg Heinrich – Fiorentina – 1998–2000
Thomas Hitzlsperger – Lazio – 2009–10
Benedikt Höwedes – Juventus – 2017–18
Carsten Jancker – Udinese – 2002–04
Ludwig Janda – Fiorentina, Novara – 1949–54
Sami Khedira – Juventus – 2015–20
Jürgen Klinsmann – Inter, Sampdoria – 1989–92, 1997–98
Miroslav Klose – Lazio – 2011–16
Jürgen Kohler – Juventus – 1991–95
Rudolf Kölbl – Padova, Genoa – 1961–62, 1964–65
Oliver Kragl – Frosinone, Crotone – 2015–16, 2017–18
Jens Lehmann – Milan – 1998–99
Moritz Leitner – Lazio – 2016–17
Lothar Matthäus – Inter – 1988–92
Andreas Möller – Juventus – 1992–94
Hansi Müller – Inter, Como – 1982–85
Shkodran Mustafi – Sampdoria – 2012–14
Herbert Neumann – Udinese, Bologna – 1980–82
Savio Nsereko – Bologna – 2009–10
Vincenzo Palumbo – Empoli – 1998–99
Lukas Podolski – Inter – 2014–15
Gerhard Poschner – Venezia – 1998–99
Stefan Reuter – Juventus – 1991–92
Karl-Heinz Riedle – Lazio – 1990–93
Antonio Rüdiger – Roma – 2015–17
Karl-Heinz Rummenigge – Inter – 1984–87
Matthias Sammer – Inter – 1992–93
Karl-Heinz Schnellinger – Mantova, Roma, Milan – 1963–74
Jürgen Schütz – Roma, Messina, Torino, Brescia – 1963–68
Karl-Heinz Spikofski – Catania – 1954–55
Horst Szymaniak – Catania, Inter, Varese – 1961–65
Malick Thiaw – Milan – 2022–
Jeremy Toljan – Sassuolo – 2019–
Rudi Völler – Roma – 1987–92
Herbert Waas – Bologna – 1989–91
Erwin Waldner – Spal – 1961–63
Amin Younes – Napoli – 2018–20
Kurt Zaro – Triestina – 1955–56
Christian Ziege – Milan – 1997–99

Greece  

Nikos Anastopoulos – Avellino – 1987–88
Lampros Choutos – Roma, Atalanta, Reggina, Inter – 1995–96, 1999–2000, 2004–07
Lazaros Christodoulopoulos – Bologna, Verona, Sampdoria – 2012–16
Traianos Dellas – Perugia, Roma – 2001–05
Dimitrios Eleftheropoulos – Messina, Ascoli, Siena – 2004–05, 2006–09
Giannis Fetfatzidis – Genoa, Chievo – 2013–15
Savvas Gentsoglou – Sampdoria – 2013–14
Grigorios Georgatos – Inter – 1999–2000, 2001–02
Panagiotis Gonias – Messina – 2004–05
José Holebas – Roma – 2014–15
Giorgos Karagounis – Inter – 2003–05
Orestis Karnezis – Udinese, Napoli – 2014–17, 2018–19
Fanis Katergiannakis – Cagliari – 2004–05
Dimitrios Keramitsis – Roma – 2021–
Panagiotis Kone – Brescia, Bologna, Udinese, Fiorentina – 2010–17
Christos Kourfalidis – Cagliari – 2021–22
Giorgos Kyriakopoulos – Sassuolo, Bologna – 2019–
Apostolos Liolidis – Atalanta – 2002–03
Konstantinos Loumpoutis – Perugia, Siena – 2002–04
Charalambos Lykogiannis – Cagliari, Bologna – 2017–
Kostas Manolas – Roma, Napoli – 2014–22
Vangelis Moras – Bologna, Cesena, Verona – 2008–12, 2013–16
Evangelois Nastos – Perugia – 2003–04
Dimitris Nikolaou – Empoli, Spezia – 2018–19, 2021–
Sotiris Ninis – Parma – 2012–13
Marios Oikonomou – Cagliari, Bologna, SPAL – 2013–14, 2015–18
Dimitrios Papadopoulos – Lecce – 2008–09
Sokratis Papastathopoulos – Genoa, Milan – 2008–11
Panagiotis Retsos – Verona – 2021–23
Nikos Spyropoulos – Chievo – 2012–13
Panagiotis Tachtsidis – Roma, Catania, Torino, Verona, Genoa, Cagliari, Lecce – 2012–17, 2019–20
Vasilis Torosidis – Roma, Bologna – 2012–18
Alexandros Tziolis – Siena – 2009–10
Alexandros Tzorvas – Palermo, Genoa – 2011–13
Georgios Vakouftsis – Fiorentina – 1999–2000, 2001–02
Zisis Vryzas – Perugia – 2000–04
Vasilis Zagaritis – Parma – 2020–21
Theodoros Zagorakis – Bologna – 2004–05

Hungary  

Botond Balogh – Parma – 2020–21
Norbert Balogh – Palermo – 2015–17
Lajos Détári – Bologna, Ancona, Genoa – 1990–91, 1992–94
Róbert Feczesin – Brescia – 2010–11
János Füzér – Genoa – 1947–48
Tibor Garay – Inter, Pro Patria – 1947–49
András Gosztonyi – Bari – 2009–10
Krisztofer Horváth – SPAL – 2019–20
János Hrotkó – Bari – 1946–49
László Kaszás – Venezia – 1961–62
Mihály Kincses – Atalanta, Juventus, Bari, Lucchese – 1946–52
Vladimir Koman – Sampdoria, Bari – 2006–07, 2009–11
Márk Kosznovszky – Parma – 2020–21
Zsolt Laczkó – Sampdoria – 2010–11
István Mike – Bologna, Lucchese, Napoli, Genoa – 1947–55
Ádám Nagy – Bologna – 2016–19
Gyula Nagy – Fiorentina – 1949–51
János Nehadoma – Fiorentina – 1933–36
István Nyers – Inter, Roma – 1948–56
Sándor Olajkár – Atalanta – 1946–47
Ferenc Ottavi – Fiorentina, Bari – 1933–34, 1935–37, 1938–39
István Pakó – Livorno – 1948–49
Rudolf Plemich – Triestina – 1929–30
Gergely Rudolf – Genoa, Bari – 2010–11
Roland Sallai – Palermo – 2016–17
Béla Sárosi – Bologna, Bari – 1946–50
Vilmos Sipos – Bologna – 1946–47
László Szőke – Udinese, Triestina – 1952–57, 1958–59
Dániel Tőzsér – Genoa – 2012–13
Gyula Tóth – Lucchese – 1947–50
István Turbéky – Pro Patria – 1949–52
Mihail Uram – Lucchese – 1948–49
Ádám Vass – Brescia – 2010–11
István Vincze – Lecce – 1988–90
Jenő Vinyei – Pro Patria, Napoli, Spal – 1949–56
József Viola – Juventus – 1929–30
Mihály Vörös – Bari – 1947–50
Dionisiu Weisz – Padova – 1924–25
József Zilisy – Milan – 1929–30
Gyula Zsengellér – Roma – 1947–49

Iceland  
Andri Fannar Baldursson – Bologna – 2019–21
Bjarki Steinn Bjarkason – Venezia – 2021–22
Birkir Bjarnason – Pescara, Sampdoria, Brescia – 2012–14, 2019–20
Mikael Egill Ellertsson – Spezia – 2022–23
Albert Guðmundsson (1923) – Milan – 1948–49
Albert Guðmundsson (1997) – Genoa – 2021–22
Emil Hallfreðsson – Reggina, Verona, Udinese, Frosinone – 2007–09, 2013–19
Þórir Jóhann Helgason – Lecce – 2022–
Hordur Magnússon – Cesena – 2014–15
Hilmir Rafn Mikaelsson – Venezia – 2021–22
Arnór Sigurðsson – Venezia – 2021–22

Israel   
Tal Banin – Brescia – 1997–98
Dor Peretz – Venezia – 2021–22
Suf Podgoreanu – Spezia – 2021–22
Eran Zahavi – Palermo – 2011–13

Kazakhstan  
Alexander Merkel – Milan, Genoa, Udinese – 2010–13, 2015–16

Kosovo  
Valon Berisha – Lazio – 2018–20
Riza Lushta – Bari, Juventus, Napoli, Alessandria – 1939–43, 1945–48
Vedat Muriqi – Lazio – 2020–22
Amir Rrahmani – Verona, Napoli – 2019–
Samir Ujkani – Palermo, Novara, Torino – 2008–09, 2011–13, 2014–15, 2019–21
Mërgim Vojvoda – Torino – 2020–

Latvia  
Raimonds Krollis – Spezia – 2022–

Liechtenstein  
Marcel Büchel – Empoli, Verona – 2015–18
Mario Frick – Verona, Siena – 2001–02, 2006–09

Lithuania  
Tomas Danilevičius – Livorno – 2004–05, 2006–07, 2009–10
Edgaras Dubickas – Lecce – 2019–20
Gvidas Gineitis – Torino – 2022–
Marius Stankevičius – Brescia, Sampdoria, Lazio – 2001–05, 2008–10, 2011–13

Luxembourg  
Issa Bah – Venezia – 2021–22

Moldova  
Vitalie Damașcan – Torino – 2018–19
Artur Ioniță – Verona, Cagliari, Benevento – 2014–21
Andrei Moțoc – Salernitana – 2021–22

Monaco  
Grégory Campi – Bari – 1997–99

Montenegro  

Marko Bakić – Torino, Fiorentina – 2012–14 
Luka Đorđević – Sampdoria – 2014–15
Uroš Đurđević – Palermo – 2015–16
Ivan Fatić – Genoa, Cesena – 2009–11
Sergej Grubac – Chievo – 2018–19
Marko Janković – SPAL – 2018–20
Stevan Jovetić – Fiorentina, Inter – 2008–13, 2015–17
Adam Marušić – Lazio – 2017–
Predrag Mijatović – Fiorentina – 1999–2002( while active)
Vukašin Poleksić – Lecce – 2003–04 ( while active)
Stefan Savić – Fiorentina  – 2012–15
Dejan Savićević – Milan – 1992–98 ( while active)
Ognjen Stijepović – Sampdoria – 2017–18
Marko Vešović – Torino – 2013–14
Mirko Vučinić – Lecce, Roma, Juventus – 2000–02, 2003–14 ( while active)
Miodrag Vukotić – Empoli – 1997–98 ( while active)

Netherlands  

Bobby Adekanye – Lazio – 2019–20
Mario Been – Pisa – 1988–89, 1990–91
Dennis Bergkamp – Inter – 1993–95
Winston Bogarde – Milan – 1997–98
Jayden Braaf – Udinese, Verona – 2020–21, 2022–
Edson Braafheid – Lazio – 2014–16
Luc Castaignos – Inter – 2011–12
Denilho Cleonise – Genoa – 2019–20
Edgar Davids – Milan, Juventus, Inter – 1996–2005
Nigel de Jong – Milan – 2012–16
Matthijs de Ligt – Juventus – 2019–22
Jonathan de Guzmán – Napoli, Carpi, Chievo – 2014–17
Stefano Denswil – Bologna – 2019–21
Marten de Roon – Atalanta – 2015–16, 2017–
Stefan de Vrij – Lazio, Inter – 2014–
Mitchell Dijks – Bologna – 2018–22
Kevin Diks – Fiorentina – 2016–17
Denzel Dumfries – Inter – 2021–
Eljero Elia – Juventus – 2011–12
Urby Emanuelson – Milan, Roma, Atalanta, Verona – 2010–16
Ruud Gullit – Milan, Sampdoria – 1987–95
Hans Hateboer – Atalanta – 2016–
Wesley Hoedt – Lazio – 2015–17, 2020–21
Klaas-Jan Huntelaar – Milan – 2009–10
Wim Jonk – Inter – 1993–95
Rick Karsdorp – Roma – 2017–19, 2020–
Denso Kasius – Bologna – 2021–23
Wim Kieft – Pisa, Torino – 1983–84, 1985–87
Ricardo Kishna – Lazio – 2015–17
Justin Kluivert – Roma – 2018–21
Patrick Kluivert – Milan – 1997–98
Teun Koopmeiners – Atalanta – 2021–
Michel Kreek – Padova, Perugia – 1994–97
Ruud Krol – Napoli – 1980–84
Piet Kruiver – Vicenza – 1961–62
Wim Lakenberg – Pro Patria – 1950–51
Sam Lammers – Atalanta, Empoli, Sampdoria – 2020–
Timo Letschert – Sassuolo – 2016–18
Bram Nuytinck – Udinese, Sampdoria – 2017–
Thomas Ouwejan – Udinese – 2020–21
Johannes Peters – Genoa, Atalanta – 1982–84, 1985–86
Michael Reiziger – Milan – 1996–97
Frank Rijkaard – Milan – 1988–93
Andries Roosenburg – Fiorentina – 1950–53
Bryan Roy – Foggia – 1992–94
Jerdy Schouten – Bologna – 2019–
Perr Schuurs – Torino – 2022–
Clarence Seedorf – Sampdoria, Inter, Milan – 1995–96, 1999–2012
Wesley Sneijder – Inter – 2009–13
Jaap Stam – Lazio, Milan – 2001–06
Kevin Strootman – Roma,  Genoa, Cagliari – 2013–19, 2020–22
Maarten Stekelenburg – Roma – 2011–13
Hidde ter Avest – Udinese – 2018–21
Marco van Basten – Milan – 1987–93
Mark van Bommel – Milan – 2010–12
Michel van de Korput – Torino – 1980–83
Andy van der Meyde – Inter – 2003–05
Edwin van der Sar – Juventus – 1999–2001
Henry van der Vegt – Udinese – 1998–2000
Gregory van der Wiel – Cagliari – 2017–18
Marco van Ginkel – Milan – 2014–15
Sydney van Hooijdonk – Bologna – 2021–22
John van 't Schip – Genoa – 1992–95
Leonard van Utrecht – Padova – 1995–96
Tonny Vilhena – Salernitana – 2022–
Marciano Vink – Genoa – 1993–94
Rai Vloet – Frosinone – 2018–19
Harald Wapenaar – Udinese – 1998–99
Georginio Wijnaldum – Roma – 2022–
Faas Wilkes – Inter, Torino – 1949–53
Aron Winter – Lazio, Inter – 1992–99
Deyovaisio Zeefuik – Verona – 2022–
Marvin Zeegelaar – Udinese – 2018–
Joshua Zirkzee – Parma, Bologna – 2020–21, 2022–
Jeroen Zoet – Spezia – 2020–

North Macedonia  

Elif Elmas – Napoli – 2019–
Agim Ibraimi – Cagliari – 2013–14
Ilija Nestorovski – Palermo, Udinese – 2016–17, 2019–
Spasoje Nikolić – Venezia – 1949–50 ( while active)
Darko Pančev – Inter – 1992–93, 1994–95
Goran Pandev – Ancona, Lazio, Inter, Napoli, Genoa – 2003–14, 2015–22
Stefan Ristovski – Parma – 2014–15
Goran Slavkovski – Inter – 2005–06
Dejan Stojanović – Bologna – 2012–14
Aleksandar Trajkovski – Palermo – 2015–17

Norway  

Haitam Aleesami – Palermo – 2016–17
Knut Andersen – Padova – 1951–52
Kristoffer Askildsen – Sampdoria, Lecce – 2019–
Runar Berg – Venezia – 1999–2000
Emil Bohinen – Salernitana – 2021–
Erik Botheim – Salernitana – 2022–
Per Bredesen – Lazio, Milan, Bari – 1952–55, 1956–57, 1958–59
John Carew – Roma – 2003–04
Emil Konradsen Ceide – Sassuolo – 2022–
Tore André Flo – Siena – 2003–05
Finn Gundersen – Verona – 1957–58
Jens Petter Hauge – Milan – 2020–21
Erik Huseklepp – Bari – 2010–11
Dennis Johnsen – Venezia – 2021–22
Julian Kristoffersen – Salernitana – 2021–23
Ragnar Larsen – Lazio, Genoa – 1951–56
Steinar Nilsen – Milan – 1997–98
Leo Skiri Østigård – Genoa, Napoli – 2021–
Martin Palumbo – Udinese, Juventus – 2019–22
John Arne Riise – Roma – 2008–11
Petter Rudi – Perugia – 1996–97
Ola Solbakken – Roma – 2022–
Stefan Strandberg – Salernitana – 2021–22
Morten Thorsby – Sampdoria – 2019–22
Kristian Thorstvedt – Sassuolo – 2022–
Rafik Zekhnini – Fiorentina – 2017–18

Poland  

Dariusz Adamczuk – Udinese – 1993–94
Błażej Augustyn – Catania – 2009–11, 2012–13
Bartosz Bereszyński – Sampdoria – 2016–
Jakub Błaszczykowski – Fiorentina – 2015–16
Zbigniew Boniek – Juventus, Roma – 1982–88
Artur Boruc – Fiorentina – 2010–12
Aleksander Buksa – Genoa – 2021–22
Thiago Cionek – Palermo, SPAL – 2015–20
Piotr Czachowski – Udinese – 1992–93
Paweł Dawidowicz – Verona – 2019–
Bartłomiej Drągowski – Fiorentina, Empoli, Spezia – 2016–
Dominik Furman – Verona – 2015–16
Kamil Glik – Bari, Torino, Benevento – 2010–11, 2012–16, 2020–21
Jakub Iskra – SPAL – 2019–20
Filip Jagiełło – Genoa – 2019–20
Paweł Jaroszyński – Chievo, Salernitana – 2017–19, 2021–22
Jakub Kiwior – Spezia – 2021–23
Kamil Kosowski – Chievo – 2006–07
Dawid Kownacki – Sampdoria – 2017–19
Marek Koźmiński – Udinese, Brescia – 1992–94, 1995–98, 2000–02
Tomasz Kupisz – Chievo – 2013–14
Igor Łasicki – Napoli – 2013–14
Karol Linetty – Sampdoria, Torino – 2016–
Marcin Listkowski – Lecce – 2022–23
Jordan Majchrzak – Roma – 2022–
Radosław Matusiak – Palermo – 2006–07
Arkadiusz Milik – Napoli, Juventus – 2016–20, 2022–
Krzysztof Piątek – Genoa, Milan, Fiorentina, Salernitana – 2018–20, 2021–
Mateusz Praszelik – Verona – 2021–22
Arkadiusz Reca – Atalanta, SPAL, Crotone, Spezia – 2018–
Bartosz Salamon – Sampdoria, Cagliari, SPAL, Frosinone – 2013–14, 2016–20
Łukasz Skorupski – Roma, Empoli, Bologna – 2013–
Mariusz Stępiński – Chievo, Verona – 2017–20
Wojciech Szczęsny – Roma, Juventus – 2015–
Łukasz Teodorczyk – Udinese – 2018–20
Kacper Urbański – Bologna – 2020–
Sebastian Walukiewicz – Cagliari, Empoli – 2019–
Kamil Wilczek – Carpi – 2015–16
Przemysław Wiśniewski – Spezia – 2022–
Rafał Wolski – Fiorentina – 2012–14
Paweł Wszołek – Sampdoria, Verona – 2013–16
Nicola Zalewski – Roma – 2020–
Piotr Zieliński – Udinese, Empoli, Napoli – 2012–
Władysław Żmuda – Verona, Cremonese – 1982–85
Szymon Żurkowski – Fiorentina, Empoli, Spezia – 2019–20, 2021–

Portugal  

Adrien Silva – Sampdoria – 2020–22
Salvador Agra – Siena – 2012–13
Hugo Almeida – Cesena – 2014–15
Beto – Udinese – 2021–
Bruno Alves – Cagliari, Parma – 2016–17, 2018–21
Jorge Andrade – Juventus – 2007–08
Vitorino Antunes – Roma, Lecce – 2007–09
Gonçalo Brandão – Siena, Parma  – 2008–10, 2011–12
Jorge Cadete – Brescia – 1994–95
Marco Caneira – Reggina – 2000–01
Cédric – Inter – 2018–19
Sérgio Conceição – Lazio, Parma, Inter – 1998–2004
Paulo Costa – Reggina – 2000–01
Félix Correia – Juventus – 2020–21
Costinha – Atalanta – 2007–08
Fernando Couto – Parma, Lazio – 1994–96, 1998–2008
Diogo Dalot – Milan – 2020–21
Danilo Pereira – Parma – 2011–12
Gil Bastião Dias – Fiorentina – 2017–18
Dimas – Juventus – 1996–99
Diogo Figueiras – Genoa – 2015–16
Eduardo – Genoa – 2010–11
Eliseu – Lazio – 2009–10
Ricardo Esteves – Reggina – 2004–05, 2006–07
Vasco Faísca – Vicenza – 2000–01
Bruno Fernandes – Udinese, Sampdoria – 2013–17
Luís Figo – Inter – 2005–09
Paulo Futre – Reggiana, Milan – 1993–96
Hilário – Perugia – 1998–2001
Hugo – Sampdoria – 1997–99
João Cancelo – Inter, Juventus – 2017–19
João Mário – Inter – 2016–19
João Moutinho – Spezia – 2022–
João Silva – Palermo – 2014–15
Bruno Jordão – Lazio – 2018–19
Jorge Humberto – Inter, Vicenza – 1961–64
Rafael Leão – Milan – 2019–
Mamede – Reggina, Messina – 2000–01, 2002–03, 2004–06
Maniche – Inter – 2007–08
Luís Maximiano – Lazio – 2022–
Iuri Medeiros – Genoa – 2017–2019
Pedro Mendes – Parma, Sassuolo – 2013–15
Dany Mota – Monza – 2022–
Herculano Nabian – Empoli – 2022–
Nani – Lazio, Venezia – 2017–18, 2021–22
Nélson – Palermo – 2012–13
Luís Neto – Siena – 2012–13
Pedro Neto – Lazio – 2018–19
Nuno Gomes – Fiorentina – 2000–02
Filipe Oliveira – Parma – 2010–11
Sérgio Oliveira – Roma – 2021–22
António Pacheco – Reggiana – 1996–97
Pelé – Inter – 2007–08
Pedro Pereira – Sampdoria, Genoa, Crotone – 2015–19, 2020–21
Bruno Pereirinha – Lazio – 2012–15
Hélder Postiga – Lazio – 2013–14
Ricardo Quaresma – Inter – 2008–10
Rolando – Napoli, Inter – 2012–14
Cristiano Ronaldo – Juventus – 2018–22
Mário Rui – Empoli, Roma, Napoli – 2014–
Rui Águas – Reggiana – 1994–95
Rui Barros – Juventus – 1988–90
Rui Costa – Fiorentina, Milan – 1994–2006
Rui Patrício – Roma – 2021–
Rui Sampaio – Cagliari – 2011–12
Leandro Sanca – Spezia – 2022–23
José Semedo – Cagliari – 2006–07
Vivaldo Semedo – Udinese – 2022–
André Silva – Milan – 2017–18, 2019–20
Paulo Sousa – Juventus, Inter, Parma – 1994–96, 1997–2000
Jorge Teixeira – Siena – 2012–13
Tiago – Juventus– 2007–10
Silvestre Varela – Parma – 2014–15
Miguel Veloso – Genoa, Verona – 2010–12, 2016–
Luís Vidigal – Napoli, Livorno, Udinese – 2000–01, 2004–08
Abel Xavier – Bari, Roma – 1995–96, 2004–05

Republic of Ireland  
Liam Brady – Juventus, Sampdoria, Inter, Ascoli – 1980–87
 Festy Ebosele – Udinese – 2022–
Robbie Keane – Inter – 2000–01
Paddy Sloan – Milan, Torino – 1948–49

Romania  

Marius Alexe – Sassuolo – 2013–14
Denis Alibec – Inter, Bologna – 2010–11, 2013–14
Romario Benzar – Lecce – 2019–20
Ionică Bogdan – Bari – 1947–48
Deian Boldor – Verona – 2017–18
Vlad Chiricheș – Napoli, Sassuolo, Cremonese – 2015–
Cristian Chivu – Roma, Inter – 2003–13
Paul Codrea – Perugia, Palermo, Siena, Bari – 2003–04, 2005–12
Cosmin Contra – Milan – 2001–02
Nicolae Dică – Catania – 2008–09
Denis Drăguș – Crotone – 2020–21
Radu Drăgușin – Juventus, Sampdoria, Salernitana – 2020–22
Iosif Fabian – Torino, Lucchese, Bari – 1947–50
Dorin Goian – Palermo – 2009–11
Gheorghe Hagi – Brescia – 1992–93
Ianis Hagi – Fiorentina – 2016–17
Norbert Höfling – Lazio, Pro Patria, Vicenza – 1948–53, 1954–56
Marius Lăcătuș – Fiorentina – 1990–91
Bogdan Lobonț – Fiorentina, Roma – 2005–06, 2009–13
Dănuț Lupu – Brescia – 1994–95
Dennis Man – Parma – 2020–21
Răzvan Marin – Cagliari, Empoli – 2020–
Dorin Mateuț – Brescia, Reggiana – 1992–95
Cristian Melinte – Palermo – 2009–10
Emil Micossi – Genoa – 1932–33
Valentin Mihăilă – Parma, Atalanta – 2020–22
Alexandru Mitriță – Pescara – 2016–17
Cosmin Moți – Siena – 2008–09
Adrian Mutu – Inter, Verona, Parma, Juventus, Fiorentina, Cesena – 1999–2003, 2004–12
Valentin Năstase – Bologna, Ascoli – 2004–05, 2006–07
Viorel Năstase – Catanzaro – 1981–83
Constantin Nica – Atalanta, Cesena – 2013–15
Paul Papp – Chievo – 2012–14
Bogdan Pătrașcu – Piacenza, Chievo – 2001–03, 2008–09
Victor Pepoli – Genoa, Palermo – 1933–35
Adrian Piț – Roma – 2007–08, 2009–10
Dan Petrescu – Foggia, Genoa – 1991–94
Gheorghe Popescu – Lecce – 2001–02
George Pușcaș – Inter, Benevento – 2014–15, 2017–18
Florian Radu – Roma – 1948–49
Ionuț Radu – Inter, Genoa, Cremonese – 2015–16, 2018–23
Ștefan Radu – Lazio – 2007–
Florin Răducioiu – Bari, Verona, Brescia, Milan – 1990–94
Ioan Sabău – Brescia, Reggiana – 1992–93, 1994–95, 1996–98
Nicolae Simatoc – Inter – 1947–49
Adrian Stoian – Roma, Chievo, Genoa, Crotone – 2008–09, 2012–14, 2016–18
Sergiu Suciu – Torino – 2008–09, 2012–13
Gabriel Torje – Udinese – 2011–12
Alin Toșca – Benevento – 2017–18
Ciprian Tătărușanu – Fiorentina, Milan – 2014–17, 2020–
Ianis Zicu – Parma – 2003–05

Russia  
Dmitri Alenichev – Roma, Perugia – 1998–2000
Viktor Budyanskiy – Juventus, Reggina, Ascoli, Udinese, Lecce – 2003–05, 2006–09
Igor Dobrovolski – Genoa – 1992–93 ( while active)
Andrei Kanchelskis – Fiorentina – 1996–98
Aleksandr Kokorin – Fiorentina – 2020–22
Igor Kolyvanov – Foggia, Bologna – 1991–95, 1996–2001 ( while active)
Aleksei Miranchuk – Atalanta, Torino – 2020–
Ruslan Nigmatullin – Verona – 2001–02
Igor Shalimov – Foggia, Inter, Udinese, Bologna – 1991–94, 1995–98 ( while active)
Igor Simutenkov – Reggiana, Bologna – 1994–95, 1996–97, 1998–99
Omari Tetradze – Roma – 1996–98

San Marino  
Massimo Bonini – Juventus, Bologna – 1981–91
Roberto Cevoli – Modena – 2002–04
Marco Macina – Bologna, Milan – 1981–82, 1985–86

Scotland  

Josh Doig – Verona – 2022–
Lewis Ferguson – Bologna – 2022–
Liam Henderson – Verona, Empoli – 2019–20, 2021–
Jack Hendry – Cremonese – 2022–23
Aaron Hickey – Bologna – 2020–22
Joe Jordan – Milan, Verona – 1981–82, 1983–84
Denis Law – Torino – 1961–62
Graeme Souness – Sampdoria – 1984–86

Serbia  

Danijel Aleksić – Genoa – 2009–10
Aleksandar Aranđelović – Padova, Roma, Novara – 1948–51 ( while active)
Vlada Avramov – Fiorentina, Cagliari, Atalanta – 2007–08, 2009–15
Dušan Basta – Lecce, Udinese, Lazio – 2008–10, 2011–18
Milan Biševac – Lazio – 2015–16
Dražen Bolić – Salernitana, Ancona – 1998–99, 2003–04 ( while active)
Vujadin Boškov – Sampdoria – 1961–62 ( while active)
Željko Brkić – Siena, Udinese, Cagliari, Carpi – 2011–16
Uroš Ćosić – Pescara, Empoli – 2012–13, 2015–17
Borislav Cvetković – Ascoli – 1988–90 ( while active)
Miloš Dimitrijević – Chievo – 2010–11
Filip Đorđević – Lazio, Chievo – 2014–17, 2018–19
Filip Đuričić – Sampdoria, Benevento, Sassuolo – 2016–
Vladislav Đukić – Cesena – 1989–90 ( while active)
Ljubiša Dunđerski – Atalanta – 1997–98, 2000–01 ( while active)
Vladimir Golemić – Crotone – 2020–21
Nikola Gulan – Fiorentina, Chievo – 2010–12
Dejan Govedarica – Lecce – 1997–98 ( while active)
Ivan Ilić – Verona – 2020–
Ivica Iliev – Messina – 2004–07 ( while active)
Ilija Ivić – Torino – 1999–2000 ( while active)
Boško Janković – Palermo, Genoa, Verona – 2007–16
Luka Jović – Fiorentina – 2022–
Vladimir Jugović – Sampdoria, Juventus, Lazio, Inter – 1992–98, 1999–2001 ( while active)
Tomislav Kaloperović – Padova – 1961–62 ( while active)
Dimitrije Kamenović – Lazio – 2021–22
Aleksandar Kocić – Perugia, Empoli – 1996–98 ( while active)
Aleksandar Kolarov – Lazio, Roma, Inter – 2007–10, 2017–22
Bora Kostić – Vicenza – 1961–62 ( while active)
Filip Kostić – Juventus – 2022–
Darko Kovačević – Juventus, Lazio – 1999–2002 ( while active)
Miloš Krasić – Juventus – 2010–12
Aleksandar Kristić – Salernitana – 1998–99 ( while active)
Nenad Krstičić – Sampdoria – 2012–16
Zdravko Kuzmanović – Fiorentina, Inter, Udinese – 2006–09, 2012–16
Marko Lazetić – Milan – 2022–23
Nikola Lazetić – Chievo, Lazio, Siena, Livorno, Torino – 2002–04, 2005–08 ( while active)
Darko Lazović – Genoa, Verona – 2015–
Adem Ljajić – Fiorentina, Roma, Inter, Torino – 2009–19
Saša Lukić – Torino – 2016–17, 2018–23
Aleksandar Luković – Ascoli, Udinese – 2006–10
Nikola Maksimović – Torino, Napoli, Genoa – 2013–22
Petar Manola – Lazio – 1942–43, 1945–47 ( while active)
Petar Mićin – Udinese – 2018–19, 2020–21
Nemanja Matić – Roma – 2022–
Siniša Mihajlović – Roma, Sampdoria, Lazio, Inter – 1992–2006 ( while active)
Bratislav Mijalković – Perugia – 1996–97 ( while active)
Milan Milanović – Palermo – 2011–12
Nikola Milenković – Fiorentina – 2017–
Sergej Milinković-Savić – Lazio – 2015–
Vanja Milinković-Savić – Torino, SPAL – 2017–19, 2020–
Savo Milošević – Parma – 2000–02 ( while active)
Zoran Mirković – Atalanta, Juventus – 1996–2000 ( while active)
Matija Nastasić – Fiorentina – 2011–13, 2021–22
Nikola Ninković – Chievo, Genoa – 2015–17
Nenad Novaković – Reggina – 2007–08
Marko Perović – Cremonese, Ancona – 1995–96, 2003–04 ( while active)
Aleksandar Pešić – Atalanta – 2016–17
Dejan Petković – Venezia – 1999–2000 ( while active)
Aleksandar Prijović – Parma – 2007–08
Nemanja Radonjić – Torino – 2022–
Ivan Radovanović – Atalanta, Bologna, Novara, Chievo, Genoa, Salernitana – 2009–23
Boris Radunović – Atalanta, Verona, Cagliari – 2015–16, 2019–20, 2021–22
Slobodan Rajković – Palermo – 2016–17
Đorđe Rakić – Reggina – 2008–09
Nenad Sakić – Lecce, Sampdoria – 1997–99 ( while active)
Lazar Samardžić – Udinese – 2021–
Stefan Šćepović – Sampdoria – 2009–10
Vlado Šmit – Bologna – 2002–03 ( while active)
Dejan Stanković – Lazio, Inter – 1998–2013 ( while active)
Alen Stevanović – Inter, Torino, – 2009–10, 2012–13
Damir Stojak – Napoli – 1997–98, 2000–01 ( while active)
Dragan Stojković – Verona – 1991–92 ( while active)
Strahinja Tanasijević – Chievo – 2018–19
Aleksa Terzić – Fiorentina – 2019–20, 2021–
Ivan Tomić – Roma – 1998–2000, 2001–03 ( while active)
Nenad Tomović – Genoa, Lecce, Fiorentina, Chievo, SPAL – 2009–20
Aleksandar Trifunović – Ascoli – 1983–84, 1986–87 ( while active)
Todor Veselinović – Sampdoria – 1961–62 ( while active)
Nemanja Vidić – Inter – 2014–15
Dušan Vlahović – Fiorentina, Juventus – 2018–
Jagoš Vuković – Verona – 2017–18
Miloš Vulić – Crotone – 2020–21
Bratislav Živković – Sampdoria – 1998–99, 2003–04 ( while active)

Slovakia  

Ján Arpáš – Juventus – 1947–48 ( while active)
Pavol Bajza – Parma – 2012–14
Marek Čech – Bologna – 2013–14
János Chawko – Palermo, Como – 1948–50 ( while active)
Ondrej Duda – Verona – 2022–
Pavol Farkaš – Chievo – 2012–13
Miloš Glonek – Ancona – 1992–93 ( while active)
Vratislav Greško – Inter, Parma – 2000–03
Norbert Gyömbér – Catania, Roma, Pescara, Salernitana – 2013–14, 2015–17, 2021–
Marek Hamšík – Brescia, Napoli – 2004–05, 2007–19
Dávid Hancko – Fiorentina – 2018–19
Lukáš Haraslín – Parma, Sassuolo – 2014–15, 2019–21
David Ivan – Sampdoria – 2015–16
Kamil Kopúnek – Bari – 2010–11
Július Korostelev – Juventus, Atalanta – 1946–49 ( while active)
Tomáš Košický – Catania – 2008–12
Matej Krajčík – Reggina – 2008–09
Juraj Kucka – Genoa, Milan, Parma – 2010–17, 2018–21
Stanislav Lobotka – Napoli – 2019–
Samuel Mráz – Empoli, Spezia – 2018–19, 2021–22
Adam Obert – Cagliari – 2021–22
Július Schubert – Torino – 1948–49 ( while active)
Milan Škriniar – Sampdoria, Inter – 2015–
Nikolas Špalek – Brescia – 2019–20
Dávid Strelec – Spezia – 2021–23
Ľubomír Tupta – Verona – 2017–18, 2020–21
Blažej Vašcák – Treviso – 2005–06
Denis Vavro – Lazio – 2019–22
Vladimír Weiss – Pescara – 2012–13

Slovenia  

Siniša Anđelković – Palermo – 2010–11, 2014–17
Armin Bačinović – Palermo – 2010–12
Vid Belec – Carpi, Benevento, Sampdoria, Salernitana – 2015–16, 2017–18, 2021–22
Jaka Bijol – Udinese – 2022–
Valter Birsa – Genoa, Torino, Milan, Chievo, Cagliari – 2011–20
Žan Celar – Roma – 2018–19
Boštjan Cesar – Chievo – 2010–19
Sebastjan Cimirotič – Lecce – 2001–02
Tio Cipot – Spezia – 2022–
Domen Črnigoj – Venezia, Salernitana – 2021–
Zlatko Dedić – Parma – 2005–07
Robert Englaro – Atalanta – 1997–98
Matjaž Florjančič – Cremonese, Empoli – 1991–92, 1993–96, 1997–98
Samir Handanović – Udinese, Treviso, Lazio, Inter – 2004–06, 2007–
Josip Iličić – Palermo, Fiorentina, Atalanta – 2010–22
Enej Jelenič – Genoa – 2010–11
Bojan Jokić – Chievo – 2009–13
Srečko Katanec – Sampdoria – 1989–94 ( while active)
Jan Koprivec – Udinese – 2008–09
Andrej Kotnik – Crotone – 2016–17
Luka Krajnc – Genoa, Cesena, Frosinone – 2012–13, 2014–15, 2018–19
Rene Krhin – Inter, Bologna – 2009–15
Jasmin Kurtić – Palermo, Sassuolo, Torino, Fiorentina, Atalanta, SPAL, Parma – 2010–11, 2012–21
Dejan Lazarević – Genoa, Chievo, Sassuolo – 2009–10, 2013–15
Sandi Lovrić – Udinese – 2022–
Žan Majer – Lecce – 2019–20
Tim Matavž – Genoa – 2015–16
Jan Mlakar – Fiorentina – 2016–17
Petar Stojanović – Empoli – 2021–
Aljaž Struna – Palermo – 2015–16
Leo Štulac – Parma, Empoli – 2018–19, 2021–22
Martin Turk – Sampdoria – 2022–
Miha Zajc – Empoli, Genoa – 2016–17, 2018–19, 2020–21

Spain  

Antonio Adán – Cagliari – 2013–14
Raúl Albiol – Napoli – 2013–19
Marcos Alonso – Fiorentina – 2013–17
Guillermo Amor – Fiorentina – 1998–2000
Álex Berenguer – Torino – 2017–21
Bojan – Roma, Milan – 2011–13
Borja Valero – Fiorentina, Inter – 2012–21
Borja Mayoral – Roma – 2020–22
José Callejón – Napoli, Fiorentina – 2013–22
Toni Calvo – Parma – 2010–11
Diego Capel – Genoa – 2015–16
Samu Castillejo – Milan – 2018–22
Chico Flores – Genoa – 2010–11
José Ángel Crespo – Bologna – 2011–12, 2013–14
Iván de la Peña – Lazio – 1998–99, 2001–02
Luis del Sol – Juventus, Roma – 1962–72
Roberto Delgado – Lazio – 2003–05
Gerard Deulofeu – Milan, Udinese – 2016–17, 2020–
Brahim Díaz – Milan – 2020–
Dídac Vilà – Milan – 2010–11
Toni Doblas – Napoli – 2013–14
Javier Farinós – Inter – 2000–04
Salva Ferrer – Spezia – 2020–
Ricardo Gallego – Udinese – 1989–90
Javier Garrido – Lazio – 2010–12
Alexandre Geijo – Udinese – 2009–10, 2014–15
Mario Gila – Lazio – 2022–
César Gómez – Roma – 1997–98
Joan González – Lecce – 2022–
Pep Guardiola – Brescia, Roma – 2001–03
Iago Falque – Genoa, Roma, Torino, Benevento – 2014–21
Iván Helguera – Roma – 1997–98
Luis Helguera – Udinese, Ancona – 2000–02, 2003–04
Joaquín – Fiorentina – 2013–15
Jony – Lazio – 2019–20
José Ángel Valdés – Roma – 2011–12
Keko – Catania – 2012–14
Pol Lirola – Sassuolo, Fiorentina – 2016–21
Diego Llorente – Roma – 2022–
Fernando Llorente – Juventus, Napoli, Udinese – 2013–16, 2019–21
David López – Napoli – 2014–16
Diego López – Milan – 2014–16
Óscar López – Lazio – 2004–05
Pau López – Roma – 2019–21
Luis Alberto – Lazio – 2016–
Iván Marcano – Roma – 2018–19
José Mari – Milan – 1999–2002
Pablo Marí – Udinese, Monza – 2021–
Fernando Marqués – Parma – 2010–12
Rafael Martín Vázquez – Torino – 1990–92
Gaizka Mendieta – Lazio – 2001–02
Michu – Napoli – 2014–15
Tòfol Montiel – Fiorentina – 2018–19, 2020–21
Martín Montoya – Inter – 2015–16
Álvaro Morata – Juventus – 2014–16, 2020–22
Javi Moreno – Milan – 2001–02
Raúl Moro – Lazio – 2019–22
Víctor Muñoz – Sampdoria – 1988–90
Álvaro Odriozola – Fiorentina – 2021–22
Patric – Lazio – 2015–
Pedro – Roma, Lazio – 2020–
Joaquín Peiró – Torino, Inter, Roma – 1962–70
Carles Pérez – Roma – 2019–22
Javier Portillo – Fiorentina – 2004–05
Pepe Reina – Napoli, Milan, Lazio – 2013–14, 2015–22
Martí Riverola – Bologna – 2012–13
Alejandro Rodríguez – Cesena, Sampdoria, Empoli – 2010–11, 2014–16, 2018–19
Jesé Rodríguez – Sampdoria – 2022–
Pablo Rodríguez – Lecce – 2022–23
Jaime Romero – Udinese, Bari – 2009–11
Rubén Pérez – Torino – 2014–15
Fabián Ruiz – Napoli – 2018–22
Víctor Ruiz – Napoli – 2010–11
Christian Rutjens – Benevento – 2017–18
Juan Santisteban – Venezia – 1961–63
Luis Suárez – Inter, Sampdoria – 1961–73
Mario Suárez – Fiorentina – 2015–16
Suso – Milan, Genoa – 2014–20
Cristian Tello – Fiorentina – 2015–17
Fernando Torres – Milan – 2014–15
Diego Tristán – Livorno – 2007–08
Joan Verdú – Fiorentina – 2015–16
Gonzalo Villar – Roma, Sampdoria – 2019–21, 2022–23
Gerard Yepes – Sampdoria – 2021–
Alberto Zapater – Genoa – 2009–10

Sweden

Switzerland  

Almen Abdi – Udinese – 2010–12
Michel Aebischer – Bologna – 2021–
Toni Allemann – Mantova – 1961–63
Steve von Bergen – Cesena, Palermo – 2010–13
Valon Behrami – Lazio, Fiorentina, Napoli, Udinese, Genoa – 2005–08, 2010–14, 2017–22
Nicky Beloko – Fiorentina – 2018–19
Gaetano Berardi – Brescia, Sampdoria – 2010–11, 2012–14
Patrick Bettoni – Vicenza – 1998–99
Davide Chiumiento – Juventus, Siena – 2003–05
Fabio Daprelà – Brescia, Palermo, Carpi – 2010–11, 2014–16
Johan Djourou – SPAL – 2018–19
Blerim Džemaili – Torino, Parma, Napoli, Genoa, Bologna – 2008–14, 2015–20
Innocent Emeghara – Siena, Livorno – 2012–14
Matteo Fedele – Carpi – 2015–16
Edimilson Fernandes – Fiorentina – 2018–19
Gélson Fernandes – Chievo, Udinese – 2010–12
Remo Freuler – Atalanta – 2015–22
Philippe Fuchs – Padova – 1948–52
Simone Grippo – Chievo – 2008–09
Nicolas Haas – Atalanta, Empoli – 2017–18, 2021–
Silvan Hefti – Genoa – 2021–22
Gökhan Inler – Udinese, Napoli – 2007–15
Pajtim Kasami – Palermo – 2010–11
Stephan Lichtsteiner – Lazio, Juventus – 2008–18
Cephas Malele – Palermo – 2012–13
Giuseppe Mazzarelli – Bari – 2000–01
Michel Morganella – Palermo, Novara – 2008–09, 2011–13, 2014–17
Bruno Mota – Sampdoria – 2006–07
Alain Nef – Udinese – 2008–09
Dimitri Oberlin – Empoli – 2018–19
Marco Padalino – Sampdoria – 2008–11
Marco Pascolo – Cagliari – 1996–97
Charles Pickel – Cremonese – 2022–
Ricardo Rodríguez – Milan, Torino – 2017–
Jonathan Rossini – Sampdoria, Sassuolo – 2012–14
Kevin Rüegg – Verona – 2020–21
Anđelko Savić – Sampdoria – 2012–13
Haris Seferovic – Fiorentina, Lecce – 2010–13
Philippe Senderos – Milan – 2008–09
David Sesa – Lecce, Napoli – 1999–2001
Ciriaco Sforza – Inter – 1996–97
Xherdan Shaqiri – Inter – 2014–15
Simon Sohm – Parma – 2020–21
Kubilay Türkyılmaz – Bologna, Brescia – 1990–91, 2000–01
Ramon Vega – Cagliari – 1996–97
Johann Vogel – Milan – 2005–06
Johan Vonlanthen – Brescia – 2004–05
Roger Vonlanthen – Inter, Alessandria – 1955–59
Silvan Widmer – Udinese – 2013–18
Denis Zakaria – Juventus – 2021–23
Fabrizio Zambrella – Brescia – 2004–05
Reto Ziegler – Sampdoria, Sassuolo – 2006–11, 2013–14

Turkey  
Kaan Ayhan – Sassuolo – 2020–23
Hakan Çalhanoğlu – Milan, Inter – 2017–
Mehmet Zeki Çelik – Roma – 2022–
Mert Çetin – Roma, Verona, Lecce – 2019–23
Ümit Davala – Milan – 2001–02
Merih Demiral – Sassuolo, Juventus, Atalanta – 2018–
Bülent Esel – Spal – 1951–54
Bülent Eken – Palermo – 1951–52
Can Bartu – Fiorentina, Venezia, Lazio – 1961–67
Emre Belözoğlu – Inter – 2001–05
Hakan Şükür – Torino, Inter, Parma – 1995–96, 2000–02
Emirhan İlkhan – Torino, Sampdoria – 2022–
Lefter Küçükandonyadis – Fiorentina – 1951–52
Mert Müldür – Sassuolo – 2019–
Metin Oktay – Palermo – 1961–62
Okan Buruk – Inter – 2001–04
Şükrü Gülesin – Palermo, Lazio – 1950–53
Salih Uçan – Roma, Empoli – 2014–16, 2018–19
Cengiz Ünder – Roma – 2017–20

Ukraine  

Serhiy Atelkin – Lecce – 1997–98
Viktor Kovalenko – Atalanta, Spezia – 2020–
Ruslan Malinovskyi – Atalanta – 2019–23
Alexei Mikhailichenko – Sampdoria – 1990–91 ( while active)
Andriy Shevchenko – Milan – 1999–2006, 2008–09
Oleksandr Yakovenko – Fiorentina – 2013–14
Vasyl Pryima – Frosinone – 2015–16
Yevhen Shakhov – Lecce – 2019–20
Vladyslav Supryaha – Sampdoria – 2021–22
Aleksandr Zavarov – Juventus – 1988–90 ( while active)

Wales  

Ethan Ampadu – Venezia, Spezia – 2021–
John Charles – Juventus, Roma – 1957–63
Aaron Ramsey – Juventus – 2019–22
Ian Rush – Juventus – 1987–88

North, central America and Caribbean (CONCACAF)

Costa Rica 
Joel Campbell – Frosinone – 2018–19
Giancarlo González – Palermo, Bologna – 2014–19
Gilberto Martínez – Brescia, Sampdoria – 2002–05, 2010–11
Hernán Medford – Foggia – 1992–93

Dominican Republic 
Antonio Santurro – Bologna – 2017–18
Vinicio Espinal – Atalanta – 2000–03
José Espinal – Atalanta – 2000–01

El Salvador 
Joshua Pérez – Fiorentina – 2016–17

Guadeloupe 
Jocelyn Angloma – Torino, Inter – 1994–97
Andreaw Gravillon – Benevento, Torino – 2017–18, 2022–

Honduras 
Edgar Álvarez – Cagliari, Roma, Messina, Livorno, Bari, Palermo – 2004–08, 2009–12
Samuel Caballero – Udinese – 2001–03
Julio César de León – Reggina, Genoa – 2002–04, 2006–08
Carlos Pavón – Udinese – 2001–02
David Suazo – Cagliari, Inter, Genoa, Catania – 1999–2000, 2004–08, 2009–10, 2011–12

Jamaica 
Rolando Aarons – Verona – 2017–18
Ravel Morrison – Lazio – 2015–16

Martinique 
Grégoire Defrel – Parma, Cesena, Sassuolo, Roma, Sampdoria – 2010–11, 2014–
Emmanuel Rivière – Crotone – 2020–21

Mexico  
Miguel Layún – Atalanta – 2009–10
Hirving Lozano – Napoli – 2019–
Rafael Márquez – Verona – 2014–16
Héctor Moreno – Roma – 2017–18
Guillermo Ochoa – Salernitana – 2022–
Carlos Salcedo – Fiorentina – 2016–17
Johan Vásquez – Genoa, Cremonese – 2021–

Panama 
Julio Dely Valdés – Cagliari – 1993–95

Saint Martin 
Wilfried Dalmat – Lecce – 2003–04

Suriname 
Djavan Anderson – Lazio – 2019–21
Ridgeciano Haps – Venezia – 2021–22

United States 
Michael Bradley – Chievo, Roma – 2011–14
Gianluca Busio – Venezia – 2021–22
Sergiño Dest – Milan – 2022–
Armando Frigo – Fiorentina – 1939–42
Alexi Lalas – Padova – 1994–96
Patrick Leal – Venezia – 2021–22
Weston McKennie – Juventus – 2020–23
Bryan Reynolds – Roma – 2020–22
Tanner Tessmann – Venezia – 2021–22

Oceania (OFC)

New Zealand 
Liberato Cacace – Empoli – 2021–

South America (CONMEBOL)

Argentina

Bolivia 
Jaume Cuéllar – SPAL – 2019–20

Brazil

Chile 

Matías Campos – Siena, Udinese – 2012–13
Carlos Carmona – Reggina, Atalanta – 2008–09, 2011–17
Nicolás Castillo – Frosinone – 2015–16
Nicolás Córdova – Perugia, Livorno, Ascoli, Messina, Brescia – 2001–02, 2004–07, 2010–11
Pascual de Gregorio – Bari – 1999–2001
Alejandro Escalona – Torino – 1999–2000
Matías Fernández – Fiorentina, Milan – 2012–17
Pablo Galdames – Genoa, Cremonese – 2021–
Julio Gutiérrez – Udinese – 2000–01, 2003–04
Mauricio Isla – Udinese, Juventus, Cagliari – 2007–14, 2015–17
Manuel Iturra – Udinese – 2015–16
Luis Jiménez – Fiorentina, Lazio, Inter, Parma, Cesena – 2005–11
Cristóbal Jorquera – Genoa, Parma – 2011–13, 2014–15
Carlos Labrín – Novara, Palermo – 2011–13
Marcelo Larrondo – Siena, Fiorentina, Torino – 2009–10, 2011–15
Gary Medel – Inter, Bologna – 2014–17, 2019–
Mauricio Pinilla – Chievo, Palermo, Cagliari, Genoa, Atalanta – 2003–04, 2010–17
David Pizarro – Udinese, Inter, Roma, Fiorentina – 1999–2015
Erick Pulgar – Bologna, Fiorentina – 2015–22
Luis Rojas – Crotone – 2020–21
Hugo Eduardo Rubio – Bologna – 1988–89
Marcelo Salas – Lazio, Juventus – 1998–2003
Mario Salgado – Brescia – 2001–02
Alexis Sánchez – Udinese, Inter – 2008–11, 2019–22
Felipe Seymour – Genoa, Catania, Chievo – 2011–13
Francisco Sierralta – Parma – 2018–19
Hector Tapia – Perugia – 1999–2000
Jorge Toro – Sampdoria, Modena, Verona – 1962–64, 1969–70
Jaime Valdés – Bari, Fiorentina, Lecce, Atalanta, Parma – 2000–01, 2004–06, 2008–10, 2011–14
Diego Valencia – Salernitana – 2022–
Eduardo Vargas – Napoli – 2011–13
Jorge Vargas – Reggina, Empoli, Livorno – 1999–2001, 2002–06
Arturo Vidal – Juventus, Inter – 2011–15, 2020–22
Iván Zamorano – Inter – 1996–2001

Colombia 

Kevin Agudelo – Genoa, Fiorentina, Spezia – 2019–
Abel Aguilar – Udinese – 2005–06
Pablo Armero – Udinese, Napoli, Milan – 2010–17
Faustino Asprilla – Parma – 1992–96, 1997–99
Carlos Bacca – Milan – 2015–17
Jorge Bolaño – Parma, Sampdoria, Lecce – 1999–2007
Miguel Borja – Livorno – 2013–14
Juan David Cabal – Verona – 2022–
Carlos Carbonero – Cesena, Sampdoria – 2014–16
Damir Ceter – Cagliari – 2017–18, 2021–22
Iván Córdoba – Inter – 2000–12
Oscar Córdoba – Perugia – 2002–03
Juan Cuadrado – Udinese, Lecce, Fiorentina, Juventus – 2009–
Fredy Guarín – Inter – 2011–16
Miguel Guerrero – Bari – 1994–96, 1997–99
Víctor Ibarbo – Cagliari, Roma – 2011–17
Jhon Lucumí – Bologna – 2022–
Gonzalo Martínez – Udinese, Reggina – 2001–04
Johan Mojica – Atalanta – 2020–21
Johnnier Montaño – Parma, Verona, Piacenza – 1999–2004
Jonny Mosquera – Livorno – 2013–14
Luis Muriel – Lecce, Udinese, Sampdoria, Fiorentina, Atalanta – 2011–17, 2018–
Jeison Murillo – Inter, Sampdoria – 2015–17, 2019–20, 2022–
David Ospina – Napoli – 2018–22
Dorlan Pabón – Parma – 2012–13
Brayan Perea – Lazio – 2013–15
Juan Fernando Quintero – Pescara – 2012–13
Freddy Rincón – Napoli – 1994–95
Nelson Rivas – Inter, Livorno – 2007–10
Carlos Sánchez – Fiorentina – 2016–18
Jorge Horacio Serna – Como – 2002–03
Andrés Tello – Empoli, Benevento – 2016–17, 2020–21
Fernando Uribe – Chievo – 2010–12
Adolfo Valencia – Reggiana – 1997–98
Juan Manuel Valencia – Bologna – 2018–19
Iván Valenciano – Atalanta – 1992–93
Brayan Vera – Lecce – 2019–20
Mario Yepes – Chievo, Milan, Atalanta – 2008–14
Alexis Zapata – Udinese – 2014–15
Cristián Zapata – Udinese, Milan, Genoa – 2005–11, 2012–21
Duván Zapata – Napoli, Udinese, Sampdoria, Atalanta – 2013–
Juan Camilo Zúñiga – Siena, Napoli, Bologna – 2008–16

Ecuador 
Bryan Cabezas – Atalanta – 2016–17
Felipe Caicedo – Lazio, Genoa, Inter – 2017–22
Iván Kaviedes – Perugia – 1998–99

Paraguay 
Dionisio Arce – Lazio, Napoli, Sampdoria, Novara, Torino, Palermo – 1949–60
Óscar Ayala – Bari – 2000–01
Édgar Barreto – Reggina, Atalanta, Palermo, Sampdoria – 2007–10, 2011–13, 2014–20
Felix Benegas – Triestina – 1950–52
Andrés Cubas – Pescara – 2016–17
Marcelo Estigarribia – Juventus, Sampdoria, Chievo, Atalanta – 2011–16
Carlos Gamarra – Inter – 2002–05
Gustavo Gómez – Milan – 2016–17
Tomás Guzmán – Siena – 2005–06
Juan Iturbe – Verona, Roma, Torino – 2013–17
Rubén Maldonado – Venezia, Napoli – 1999–2001, 2007–08
Víctor Hugo Mareco – Brescia – 2002–05, 2010–11
César Meza – Cesena – 2011–12
José Montiel – Udinese, Reggina – 2006–08
Gustavo Neffa – Cremonese – 1989–90, 1991–92
Miguel Ortega – Genoa – 1946–48
Carlos Humberto Paredes – Reggina – 2002–06
José Parodi – Padova, Genoa – 1955–57
Silvio Parodi Ramos – Fiorentina – 1956–57
Iván Piris – Roma, Udinese – 2012–13, 2014–16
Antonio Sanabria – Sassuolo, Roma, Genoa, Torino – 2013–15, 2018–
Federico Santander – Bologna – 2018–22
Delio Toledo – Udinese – 1998–99
Leongino Unzaim – Lazio – 1950–51

Peru 
Álvaro Ampuero – Parma – 2012–13
Gerónimo Barbadillo – Avellino, Udinese – 1982–86
Víctor Benítez – Milan, Messina, Roma, Venezia, Inter – 1962–70
Rinaldo Cruzado – Chievo – 2011–13
Alberto Gallardo – Milan, Cagliari – 1963–66
Gianluca Lapadula – Milan, Genoa, Lecce, Benevento – 2016–21
Hugo Natteri – Triestina, Alessandria – 1956–58
Juan Seminario – Fiorentina – 1962–64
Julio Uribe – Cagliari – 1982–83
Juan Manuel Vargas – Catania, Fiorentina, Genoa – 2006–15

Uruguay

Venezuela 
Jhon Chancellor – Brescia – 2019–20
Gabriel Cichero – Lecce – 2005–06
Rolf Feltscher – Parma – 2010–12
Darwin Machís – Udinese – 2018–19
Massimo Margiotta – Udinese – 1999–2001, 2003–04
Josef Martínez – Torino – 2014–17
Edgar Moras – Genoa – 1982-83
Yordan Osorio – Parma – 2020–21
Adalberto Peñaranda – Udinese – 2016–17
Andrés Ponce – Sampdoria – 2015–16
Tomás Rincón – Genoa, Juventus, Torino, Sampdoria – 2014–
Aristóteles Romero – Crotone – 2017–18
Rafael Romo – Udinese – 2009–10
Franco Signorelli – Empoli – 2014–16
Ernesto Torregrossa – Brescia, Sampdoria – 2019–22

See also
Foreign Serie A Footballer of the Year
List of Argentine footballers in Serie A
List of Brazilian footballers in Serie A
List of Uruguayan footballers in Serie A
List of foreign Serie B players
Oriundo

Notes

References 

Italy
 
Expatriate footballers in Italy
Association football player non-biographical articles